

552001–552100 

|-bgcolor=#d6d6d6
| 552001 ||  || — || September 29, 2008 || Catalina || CSS ||  || align=right | 3.1 km || 
|-id=002 bgcolor=#d6d6d6
| 552002 ||  || — || September 11, 2007 || Catalina || CSS ||  || align=right | 3.2 km || 
|-id=003 bgcolor=#d6d6d6
| 552003 ||  || — || January 23, 2006 || Mount Lemmon || Mount Lemmon Survey ||  || align=right | 2.3 km || 
|-id=004 bgcolor=#d6d6d6
| 552004 ||  || — || October 10, 2008 || Mount Lemmon || Mount Lemmon Survey ||  || align=right | 2.7 km || 
|-id=005 bgcolor=#d6d6d6
| 552005 ||  || — || September 22, 2008 || Mount Lemmon || Mount Lemmon Survey ||  || align=right | 2.9 km || 
|-id=006 bgcolor=#d6d6d6
| 552006 ||  || — || October 31, 2008 || Mount Lemmon || Mount Lemmon Survey ||  || align=right | 2.5 km || 
|-id=007 bgcolor=#d6d6d6
| 552007 ||  || — || September 4, 2008 || Kitt Peak || Spacewatch ||  || align=right | 2.3 km || 
|-id=008 bgcolor=#d6d6d6
| 552008 ||  || — || August 15, 2013 || Haleakala || Pan-STARRS ||  || align=right | 2.4 km || 
|-id=009 bgcolor=#d6d6d6
| 552009 ||  || — || March 2, 2011 || Kitt Peak || Spacewatch ||  || align=right | 2.9 km || 
|-id=010 bgcolor=#d6d6d6
| 552010 ||  || — || February 21, 2007 || Mount Lemmon || Mount Lemmon Survey ||  || align=right | 3.1 km || 
|-id=011 bgcolor=#d6d6d6
| 552011 ||  || — || January 11, 2010 || Kitt Peak || Spacewatch ||  || align=right | 2.9 km || 
|-id=012 bgcolor=#d6d6d6
| 552012 ||  || — || October 3, 2002 || Palomar || NEAT ||  || align=right | 4.2 km || 
|-id=013 bgcolor=#d6d6d6
| 552013 ||  || — || February 14, 2005 || Kitt Peak || Spacewatch ||  || align=right | 2.7 km || 
|-id=014 bgcolor=#d6d6d6
| 552014 ||  || — || March 11, 2005 || Mount Lemmon || Mount Lemmon Survey ||  || align=right | 4.0 km || 
|-id=015 bgcolor=#d6d6d6
| 552015 ||  || — || November 18, 2003 || Kitt Peak || Spacewatch ||  || align=right | 3.1 km || 
|-id=016 bgcolor=#fefefe
| 552016 ||  || — || October 15, 2006 || Kitt Peak || Spacewatch ||  || align=right data-sort-value="0.49" | 490 m || 
|-id=017 bgcolor=#fefefe
| 552017 ||  || — || August 14, 2013 || Haleakala || Pan-STARRS ||  || align=right data-sort-value="0.65" | 650 m || 
|-id=018 bgcolor=#fefefe
| 552018 ||  || — || June 15, 2009 || Kitt Peak || Spacewatch ||  || align=right data-sort-value="0.68" | 680 m || 
|-id=019 bgcolor=#d6d6d6
| 552019 ||  || — || December 16, 2009 || Mount Lemmon || Mount Lemmon Survey ||  || align=right | 2.3 km || 
|-id=020 bgcolor=#d6d6d6
| 552020 ||  || — || February 18, 2004 || Kitt Peak || Spacewatch ||  || align=right | 2.8 km || 
|-id=021 bgcolor=#d6d6d6
| 552021 ||  || — || July 27, 2002 || Palomar || NEAT ||  || align=right | 3.4 km || 
|-id=022 bgcolor=#fefefe
| 552022 ||  || — || October 19, 2006 || Catalina || CSS ||  || align=right data-sort-value="0.73" | 730 m || 
|-id=023 bgcolor=#d6d6d6
| 552023 ||  || — || September 14, 2013 || Kitt Peak || Spacewatch ||  || align=right | 2.5 km || 
|-id=024 bgcolor=#fefefe
| 552024 ||  || — || September 6, 2013 || Kitt Peak || Spacewatch ||  || align=right data-sort-value="0.80" | 800 m || 
|-id=025 bgcolor=#d6d6d6
| 552025 ||  || — || February 15, 2010 || Kitt Peak || Spacewatch ||  || align=right | 2.5 km || 
|-id=026 bgcolor=#fefefe
| 552026 ||  || — || August 22, 1995 || Kitt Peak || Spacewatch ||  || align=right data-sort-value="0.43" | 430 m || 
|-id=027 bgcolor=#d6d6d6
| 552027 ||  || — || September 14, 2013 || Kitt Peak || Spacewatch ||  || align=right | 2.8 km || 
|-id=028 bgcolor=#d6d6d6
| 552028 ||  || — || May 4, 2005 || Mauna Kea || Mauna Kea Obs. || VER || align=right | 2.9 km || 
|-id=029 bgcolor=#d6d6d6
| 552029 ||  || — || September 15, 2013 || Mount Lemmon || Mount Lemmon Survey ||  || align=right | 2.5 km || 
|-id=030 bgcolor=#fefefe
| 552030 ||  || — || September 15, 2013 || Palomar || PTF ||  || align=right data-sort-value="0.59" | 590 m || 
|-id=031 bgcolor=#fefefe
| 552031 ||  || — || September 4, 2002 || Palomar || NEAT || NYS || align=right data-sort-value="0.59" | 590 m || 
|-id=032 bgcolor=#d6d6d6
| 552032 ||  || — || September 10, 2013 || Calar Alto-CASADO || S. Mottola ||  || align=right | 2.9 km || 
|-id=033 bgcolor=#C2E0FF
| 552033 ||  || — || September 8, 2013 || Cerro Tololo-DECam || CTIO-DECam || SDO || align=right | 243 km || 
|-id=034 bgcolor=#d6d6d6
| 552034 ||  || — || March 25, 2006 || Mount Lemmon || Mount Lemmon Survey ||  || align=right | 2.1 km || 
|-id=035 bgcolor=#d6d6d6
| 552035 ||  || — || September 4, 2013 || Mount Lemmon || Mount Lemmon Survey ||  || align=right | 2.7 km || 
|-id=036 bgcolor=#d6d6d6
| 552036 ||  || — || September 14, 2013 || Mount Lemmon || Mount Lemmon Survey ||  || align=right | 2.5 km || 
|-id=037 bgcolor=#fefefe
| 552037 ||  || — || January 26, 2012 || Mount Lemmon || Mount Lemmon Survey || H || align=right data-sort-value="0.64" | 640 m || 
|-id=038 bgcolor=#fefefe
| 552038 ||  || — || September 10, 2013 || Haleakala || Pan-STARRS ||  || align=right data-sort-value="0.55" | 550 m || 
|-id=039 bgcolor=#fefefe
| 552039 ||  || — || December 25, 2006 || Kitt Peak || Spacewatch ||  || align=right data-sort-value="0.57" | 570 m || 
|-id=040 bgcolor=#d6d6d6
| 552040 ||  || — || September 15, 2013 || Haleakala || Pan-STARRS ||  || align=right | 2.5 km || 
|-id=041 bgcolor=#d6d6d6
| 552041 ||  || — || September 5, 2013 || Kitt Peak || Spacewatch ||  || align=right | 2.5 km || 
|-id=042 bgcolor=#d6d6d6
| 552042 ||  || — || March 15, 2010 || Mount Lemmon || Mount Lemmon Survey ||  || align=right | 3.2 km || 
|-id=043 bgcolor=#d6d6d6
| 552043 ||  || — || September 5, 2013 || Kitt Peak || Spacewatch ||  || align=right | 3.4 km || 
|-id=044 bgcolor=#d6d6d6
| 552044 ||  || — || February 11, 2016 || Haleakala || Pan-STARRS ||  || align=right | 2.5 km || 
|-id=045 bgcolor=#d6d6d6
| 552045 ||  || — || October 9, 2002 || Kitt Peak || Spacewatch ||  || align=right | 2.5 km || 
|-id=046 bgcolor=#C2FFFF
| 552046 ||  || — || September 6, 2013 || Mount Lemmon || Mount Lemmon Survey || L5 || align=right | 8.0 km || 
|-id=047 bgcolor=#d6d6d6
| 552047 ||  || — || September 19, 1998 || Apache Point || SDSS Collaboration ||  || align=right | 2.4 km || 
|-id=048 bgcolor=#d6d6d6
| 552048 ||  || — || November 21, 2003 || Kitt Peak || Spacewatch ||  || align=right | 2.5 km || 
|-id=049 bgcolor=#d6d6d6
| 552049 ||  || — || September 6, 2013 || Mount Lemmon || Mount Lemmon Survey ||  || align=right | 2.5 km || 
|-id=050 bgcolor=#fefefe
| 552050 ||  || — || September 2, 2013 || Mount Lemmon || Mount Lemmon Survey ||  || align=right data-sort-value="0.49" | 490 m || 
|-id=051 bgcolor=#d6d6d6
| 552051 ||  || — || September 14, 2013 || Haleakala || Pan-STARRS ||  || align=right | 2.4 km || 
|-id=052 bgcolor=#fefefe
| 552052 ||  || — || September 5, 2013 || Kitt Peak || Spacewatch || H || align=right data-sort-value="0.52" | 520 m || 
|-id=053 bgcolor=#d6d6d6
| 552053 ||  || — || September 17, 2013 || Mount Lemmon || Mount Lemmon Survey ||  || align=right | 3.7 km || 
|-id=054 bgcolor=#d6d6d6
| 552054 ||  || — || September 17, 2013 || Mount Lemmon || Mount Lemmon Survey ||  || align=right | 2.8 km || 
|-id=055 bgcolor=#d6d6d6
| 552055 ||  || — || September 12, 2013 || Mount Lemmon || Mount Lemmon Survey ||  || align=right | 2.7 km || 
|-id=056 bgcolor=#E9E9E9
| 552056 ||  || — || November 8, 2009 || Mount Lemmon || Mount Lemmon Survey ||  || align=right | 2.1 km || 
|-id=057 bgcolor=#fefefe
| 552057 ||  || — || March 13, 2005 || Kitt Peak || Spacewatch ||  || align=right data-sort-value="0.68" | 680 m || 
|-id=058 bgcolor=#d6d6d6
| 552058 ||  || — || August 14, 2013 || Haleakala || Pan-STARRS ||  || align=right | 2.2 km || 
|-id=059 bgcolor=#d6d6d6
| 552059 ||  || — || September 24, 2013 || Kitt Peak || Spacewatch ||  || align=right | 2.5 km || 
|-id=060 bgcolor=#fefefe
| 552060 ||  || — || September 26, 2006 || Mount Lemmon || Mount Lemmon Survey ||  || align=right data-sort-value="0.62" | 620 m || 
|-id=061 bgcolor=#fefefe
| 552061 ||  || — || April 15, 2012 || Haleakala || Pan-STARRS ||  || align=right | 1.4 km || 
|-id=062 bgcolor=#d6d6d6
| 552062 ||  || — || September 19, 1998 || Apache Point || SDSS Collaboration ||  || align=right | 2.5 km || 
|-id=063 bgcolor=#d6d6d6
| 552063 ||  || — || March 14, 2007 || Mount Lemmon || Mount Lemmon Survey ||  || align=right | 2.1 km || 
|-id=064 bgcolor=#fefefe
| 552064 ||  || — || January 28, 2011 || Mount Lemmon || Mount Lemmon Survey ||  || align=right data-sort-value="0.87" | 870 m || 
|-id=065 bgcolor=#fefefe
| 552065 ||  || — || November 19, 2006 || Kitt Peak || Spacewatch ||  || align=right data-sort-value="0.75" | 750 m || 
|-id=066 bgcolor=#d6d6d6
| 552066 ||  || — || April 28, 2011 || Haleakala || Pan-STARRS || 7:4 || align=right | 2.9 km || 
|-id=067 bgcolor=#fefefe
| 552067 ||  || — || February 1, 2011 || Kitt Peak || Spacewatch ||  || align=right data-sort-value="0.65" | 650 m || 
|-id=068 bgcolor=#d6d6d6
| 552068 ||  || — || July 18, 2013 || Haleakala || Pan-STARRS ||  || align=right | 3.1 km || 
|-id=069 bgcolor=#d6d6d6
| 552069 ||  || — || September 28, 2002 || Haleakala || AMOS || HYG || align=right | 3.6 km || 
|-id=070 bgcolor=#d6d6d6
| 552070 ||  || — || September 1, 2013 || Mount Lemmon || Mount Lemmon Survey ||  || align=right | 2.3 km || 
|-id=071 bgcolor=#d6d6d6
| 552071 ||  || — || September 9, 2013 || Haleakala || Pan-STARRS ||  || align=right | 2.4 km || 
|-id=072 bgcolor=#d6d6d6
| 552072 ||  || — || September 6, 2008 || Mount Lemmon || Mount Lemmon Survey ||  || align=right | 2.1 km || 
|-id=073 bgcolor=#d6d6d6
| 552073 ||  || — || November 8, 2008 || Kitt Peak || Spacewatch ||  || align=right | 2.2 km || 
|-id=074 bgcolor=#d6d6d6
| 552074 ||  || — || March 14, 2005 || Mount Lemmon || Mount Lemmon Survey || EOS || align=right | 2.6 km || 
|-id=075 bgcolor=#d6d6d6
| 552075 ||  || — || September 25, 2013 || Catalina || CSS ||  || align=right | 3.5 km || 
|-id=076 bgcolor=#fefefe
| 552076 ||  || — || August 18, 2002 || Palomar || NEAT ||  || align=right data-sort-value="0.68" | 680 m || 
|-id=077 bgcolor=#d6d6d6
| 552077 ||  || — || August 28, 2002 || Palomar || NEAT ||  || align=right | 3.5 km || 
|-id=078 bgcolor=#d6d6d6
| 552078 ||  || — || September 9, 2002 || Campo Imperatore || CINEOS ||  || align=right | 3.7 km || 
|-id=079 bgcolor=#fefefe
| 552079 ||  || — || October 12, 2006 || Kitt Peak || Spacewatch ||  || align=right data-sort-value="0.71" | 710 m || 
|-id=080 bgcolor=#d6d6d6
| 552080 ||  || — || September 29, 2013 || Kitt Peak || Spacewatch ||  || align=right | 2.3 km || 
|-id=081 bgcolor=#d6d6d6
| 552081 ||  || — || September 20, 2002 || Palomar || NEAT ||  || align=right | 3.2 km || 
|-id=082 bgcolor=#d6d6d6
| 552082 ||  || — || October 10, 2002 || Palomar || NEAT ||  || align=right | 4.0 km || 
|-id=083 bgcolor=#fefefe
| 552083 ||  || — || September 26, 2013 || Palomar || PTF ||  || align=right data-sort-value="0.90" | 900 m || 
|-id=084 bgcolor=#E9E9E9
| 552084 ||  || — || April 19, 2012 || Mount Lemmon || Mount Lemmon Survey || JUN || align=right | 1.2 km || 
|-id=085 bgcolor=#E9E9E9
| 552085 ||  || — || October 18, 2004 || Kitt Peak || M. W. Buie, D. E. Trilling ||  || align=right | 2.0 km || 
|-id=086 bgcolor=#fefefe
| 552086 ||  || — || August 5, 2013 || Piszkesteto || K. Sárneczky ||  || align=right data-sort-value="0.78" | 780 m || 
|-id=087 bgcolor=#d6d6d6
| 552087 ||  || — || September 24, 2008 || Mount Lemmon || Mount Lemmon Survey ||  || align=right | 2.3 km || 
|-id=088 bgcolor=#d6d6d6
| 552088 ||  || — || February 9, 2005 || Kitt Peak || Spacewatch ||  || align=right | 2.7 km || 
|-id=089 bgcolor=#d6d6d6
| 552089 ||  || — || September 6, 2013 || Mount Lemmon || Mount Lemmon Survey ||  || align=right | 3.2 km || 
|-id=090 bgcolor=#E9E9E9
| 552090 ||  || — || September 28, 2013 || Palomar || PTF ||  || align=right | 2.4 km || 
|-id=091 bgcolor=#d6d6d6
| 552091 ||  || — || September 26, 2008 || Mount Lemmon || Mount Lemmon Survey ||  || align=right | 1.9 km || 
|-id=092 bgcolor=#d6d6d6
| 552092 ||  || — || November 19, 2008 || Kitt Peak || Spacewatch ||  || align=right | 2.3 km || 
|-id=093 bgcolor=#d6d6d6
| 552093 ||  || — || March 9, 2005 || Mount Lemmon || Mount Lemmon Survey ||  || align=right | 3.1 km || 
|-id=094 bgcolor=#d6d6d6
| 552094 ||  || — || September 17, 2013 || Mount Lemmon || Mount Lemmon Survey ||  || align=right | 2.8 km || 
|-id=095 bgcolor=#d6d6d6
| 552095 ||  || — || November 19, 2008 || Kitt Peak || Spacewatch ||  || align=right | 2.7 km || 
|-id=096 bgcolor=#d6d6d6
| 552096 ||  || — || September 28, 2013 || Mount Lemmon || Mount Lemmon Survey ||  || align=right | 2.4 km || 
|-id=097 bgcolor=#d6d6d6
| 552097 ||  || — || April 20, 2007 || Kitt Peak || Spacewatch ||  || align=right | 2.8 km || 
|-id=098 bgcolor=#d6d6d6
| 552098 ||  || — || October 1, 2013 || Palomar || PTF ||  || align=right | 2.8 km || 
|-id=099 bgcolor=#d6d6d6
| 552099 ||  || — || September 13, 2007 || Mount Lemmon || Mount Lemmon Survey ||  || align=right | 3.4 km || 
|-id=100 bgcolor=#d6d6d6
| 552100 ||  || — || April 12, 2005 || Kitt Peak || Spacewatch ||  || align=right | 3.7 km || 
|}

552101–552200 

|-bgcolor=#d6d6d6
| 552101 ||  || — || September 3, 2013 || Mount Lemmon || Mount Lemmon Survey ||  || align=right | 2.9 km || 
|-id=102 bgcolor=#d6d6d6
| 552102 ||  || — || October 5, 2013 || Oukaimeden || C. Rinner ||  || align=right | 2.4 km || 
|-id=103 bgcolor=#d6d6d6
| 552103 ||  || — || September 9, 2013 || Haleakala || Pan-STARRS ||  || align=right | 2.8 km || 
|-id=104 bgcolor=#d6d6d6
| 552104 ||  || — || October 2, 2008 || Mount Lemmon || Mount Lemmon Survey ||  || align=right | 2.1 km || 
|-id=105 bgcolor=#d6d6d6
| 552105 ||  || — || January 28, 2004 || Kitt Peak || Spacewatch ||  || align=right | 2.8 km || 
|-id=106 bgcolor=#d6d6d6
| 552106 ||  || — || September 14, 2007 || Kitt Peak || Spacewatch ||  || align=right | 2.9 km || 
|-id=107 bgcolor=#d6d6d6
| 552107 ||  || — || December 1, 2008 || Kitt Peak || Spacewatch || THM || align=right | 1.8 km || 
|-id=108 bgcolor=#E9E9E9
| 552108 ||  || — || October 1, 2013 || Mount Lemmon || Mount Lemmon Survey ||  || align=right | 2.4 km || 
|-id=109 bgcolor=#d6d6d6
| 552109 ||  || — || February 25, 2011 || Mount Lemmon || Mount Lemmon Survey ||  || align=right | 3.5 km || 
|-id=110 bgcolor=#fefefe
| 552110 ||  || — || May 19, 2005 || Siding Spring || SSS ||  || align=right | 1.1 km || 
|-id=111 bgcolor=#d6d6d6
| 552111 ||  || — || July 20, 2013 || Haleakala || Pan-STARRS ||  || align=right | 3.1 km || 
|-id=112 bgcolor=#d6d6d6
| 552112 ||  || — || October 15, 2002 || Palomar || NEAT ||  || align=right | 3.1 km || 
|-id=113 bgcolor=#d6d6d6
| 552113 ||  || — || March 16, 2001 || Kitt Peak || Spacewatch || KOR || align=right | 1.9 km || 
|-id=114 bgcolor=#E9E9E9
| 552114 ||  || — || April 5, 2002 || Palomar || NEAT || GEF || align=right | 1.5 km || 
|-id=115 bgcolor=#d6d6d6
| 552115 ||  || — || October 25, 2008 || Kitt Peak || Spacewatch ||  || align=right | 2.3 km || 
|-id=116 bgcolor=#fefefe
| 552116 ||  || — || February 10, 2011 || Mount Lemmon || Mount Lemmon Survey ||  || align=right data-sort-value="0.57" | 570 m || 
|-id=117 bgcolor=#C2FFFF
| 552117 ||  || — || March 18, 2007 || Kitt Peak || Spacewatch || L5 || align=right | 10 km || 
|-id=118 bgcolor=#d6d6d6
| 552118 ||  || — || April 6, 2011 || Mount Lemmon || Mount Lemmon Survey ||  || align=right | 2.3 km || 
|-id=119 bgcolor=#d6d6d6
| 552119 ||  || — || September 13, 2007 || Kitt Peak || Spacewatch ||  || align=right | 3.1 km || 
|-id=120 bgcolor=#d6d6d6
| 552120 ||  || — || September 14, 2013 || Haleakala || Pan-STARRS ||  || align=right | 2.7 km || 
|-id=121 bgcolor=#d6d6d6
| 552121 ||  || — || September 13, 2002 || Palomar || NEAT || EOS || align=right | 2.0 km || 
|-id=122 bgcolor=#C2FFFF
| 552122 ||  || — || March 26, 2009 || Kitt Peak || Spacewatch || L5 || align=right | 9.0 km || 
|-id=123 bgcolor=#fefefe
| 552123 ||  || — || January 10, 2007 || Kitt Peak || Spacewatch ||  || align=right data-sort-value="0.77" | 770 m || 
|-id=124 bgcolor=#d6d6d6
| 552124 ||  || — || October 3, 2013 || Haleakala || Pan-STARRS ||  || align=right | 2.5 km || 
|-id=125 bgcolor=#fefefe
| 552125 ||  || — || September 13, 2013 || Mount Lemmon || Mount Lemmon Survey ||  || align=right data-sort-value="0.68" | 680 m || 
|-id=126 bgcolor=#d6d6d6
| 552126 ||  || — || September 11, 2007 || Mount Lemmon || Mount Lemmon Survey ||  || align=right | 3.4 km || 
|-id=127 bgcolor=#C2FFFF
| 552127 ||  || — || October 4, 2013 || Mount Lemmon || Mount Lemmon Survey || L5 || align=right | 8.5 km || 
|-id=128 bgcolor=#d6d6d6
| 552128 ||  || — || October 4, 2013 || Mount Lemmon || Mount Lemmon Survey ||  || align=right | 2.9 km || 
|-id=129 bgcolor=#d6d6d6
| 552129 ||  || — || January 19, 2005 || Kitt Peak || Spacewatch ||  || align=right | 2.7 km || 
|-id=130 bgcolor=#fefefe
| 552130 ||  || — || January 11, 2011 || Catalina || CSS ||  || align=right data-sort-value="0.81" | 810 m || 
|-id=131 bgcolor=#E9E9E9
| 552131 ||  || — || November 26, 2009 || Kitt Peak || Spacewatch ||  || align=right | 2.1 km || 
|-id=132 bgcolor=#d6d6d6
| 552132 ||  || — || October 2, 2013 || Kitt Peak || Spacewatch ||  || align=right | 2.5 km || 
|-id=133 bgcolor=#d6d6d6
| 552133 ||  || — || October 3, 2013 || Kitt Peak || Spacewatch ||  || align=right | 3.5 km || 
|-id=134 bgcolor=#d6d6d6
| 552134 ||  || — || November 7, 2002 || Kitt Peak || Kitt Peak Obs. ||  || align=right | 3.5 km || 
|-id=135 bgcolor=#d6d6d6
| 552135 ||  || — || May 12, 2012 || Haleakala || Pan-STARRS ||  || align=right | 2.8 km || 
|-id=136 bgcolor=#d6d6d6
| 552136 ||  || — || September 14, 2013 || Mount Lemmon || Mount Lemmon Survey || EOS || align=right | 2.0 km || 
|-id=137 bgcolor=#d6d6d6
| 552137 ||  || — || October 3, 2013 || Kitt Peak || Spacewatch ||  || align=right | 2.4 km || 
|-id=138 bgcolor=#d6d6d6
| 552138 ||  || — || September 23, 2008 || Mount Lemmon || Mount Lemmon Survey ||  || align=right | 2.5 km || 
|-id=139 bgcolor=#E9E9E9
| 552139 ||  || — || March 16, 2007 || Catalina || CSS ||  || align=right | 2.6 km || 
|-id=140 bgcolor=#d6d6d6
| 552140 ||  || — || October 9, 2002 || Kitt Peak || Spacewatch ||  || align=right | 3.1 km || 
|-id=141 bgcolor=#d6d6d6
| 552141 ||  || — || April 24, 2011 || Mount Lemmon || Mount Lemmon Survey || EOS || align=right | 2.1 km || 
|-id=142 bgcolor=#d6d6d6
| 552142 ||  || — || February 11, 2004 || Palomar || NEAT || EOS || align=right | 2.3 km || 
|-id=143 bgcolor=#fefefe
| 552143 ||  || — || May 12, 2005 || Palomar || NEAT ||  || align=right | 1.2 km || 
|-id=144 bgcolor=#E9E9E9
| 552144 ||  || — || October 13, 2004 || Kitt Peak || Spacewatch ||  || align=right | 1.9 km || 
|-id=145 bgcolor=#fefefe
| 552145 ||  || — || January 27, 2011 || Mount Lemmon || Mount Lemmon Survey ||  || align=right data-sort-value="0.59" | 590 m || 
|-id=146 bgcolor=#fefefe
| 552146 ||  || — || July 27, 2009 || Catalina || CSS ||  || align=right data-sort-value="0.88" | 880 m || 
|-id=147 bgcolor=#d6d6d6
| 552147 ||  || — || October 1, 2013 || Mount Lemmon || Mount Lemmon Survey ||  || align=right | 2.4 km || 
|-id=148 bgcolor=#d6d6d6
| 552148 ||  || — || October 3, 2002 || Socorro || LINEAR ||  || align=right | 3.4 km || 
|-id=149 bgcolor=#fefefe
| 552149 ||  || — || October 1, 2002 || Anderson Mesa || LONEOS || NYS || align=right data-sort-value="0.60" | 600 m || 
|-id=150 bgcolor=#d6d6d6
| 552150 ||  || — || May 4, 2005 || Kitt Peak || Spacewatch ||  || align=right | 3.7 km || 
|-id=151 bgcolor=#fefefe
| 552151 ||  || — || October 1, 2013 || Kitt Peak || Spacewatch ||  || align=right data-sort-value="0.52" | 520 m || 
|-id=152 bgcolor=#d6d6d6
| 552152 ||  || — || March 11, 2005 || Mount Lemmon || Mount Lemmon Survey ||  || align=right | 3.5 km || 
|-id=153 bgcolor=#E9E9E9
| 552153 ||  || — || April 20, 2012 || Mount Lemmon || Mount Lemmon Survey ||  || align=right | 2.2 km || 
|-id=154 bgcolor=#fefefe
| 552154 ||  || — || October 2, 2013 || Haleakala || Pan-STARRS ||  || align=right data-sort-value="0.65" | 650 m || 
|-id=155 bgcolor=#fefefe
| 552155 ||  || — || August 13, 2002 || Palomar || NEAT ||  || align=right data-sort-value="0.72" | 720 m || 
|-id=156 bgcolor=#fefefe
| 552156 ||  || — || May 8, 2005 || Mount Lemmon || Mount Lemmon Survey || MAS || align=right data-sort-value="0.76" | 760 m || 
|-id=157 bgcolor=#fefefe
| 552157 ||  || — || March 8, 2011 || Mount Lemmon || Mount Lemmon Survey ||  || align=right data-sort-value="0.94" | 940 m || 
|-id=158 bgcolor=#d6d6d6
| 552158 ||  || — || November 8, 2008 || Kitt Peak || Spacewatch ||  || align=right | 2.9 km || 
|-id=159 bgcolor=#d6d6d6
| 552159 ||  || — || October 3, 2013 || Kitt Peak || Spacewatch ||  || align=right | 2.1 km || 
|-id=160 bgcolor=#d6d6d6
| 552160 ||  || — || August 19, 2001 || Cerro Tololo || Cerro Tololo Obs. ||  || align=right | 3.7 km || 
|-id=161 bgcolor=#d6d6d6
| 552161 ||  || — || October 3, 2013 || Kitt Peak || Spacewatch ||  || align=right | 3.4 km || 
|-id=162 bgcolor=#d6d6d6
| 552162 ||  || — || October 3, 2013 || Mount Lemmon || Mount Lemmon Survey ||  || align=right | 2.4 km || 
|-id=163 bgcolor=#d6d6d6
| 552163 ||  || — || May 8, 2011 || Mount Lemmon || Mount Lemmon Survey ||  || align=right | 3.5 km || 
|-id=164 bgcolor=#FA8072
| 552164 ||  || — || September 13, 2013 || Palomar || PTF ||  || align=right data-sort-value="0.61" | 610 m || 
|-id=165 bgcolor=#d6d6d6
| 552165 ||  || — || October 5, 2002 || Palomar || NEAT ||  || align=right | 2.9 km || 
|-id=166 bgcolor=#d6d6d6
| 552166 ||  || — || September 11, 2002 || Haleakala || AMOS ||  || align=right | 3.2 km || 
|-id=167 bgcolor=#d6d6d6
| 552167 ||  || — || January 8, 2011 || Mount Lemmon || Mount Lemmon Survey ||  || align=right | 3.4 km || 
|-id=168 bgcolor=#d6d6d6
| 552168 ||  || — || October 4, 2013 || Mount Lemmon || Mount Lemmon Survey ||  || align=right | 2.0 km || 
|-id=169 bgcolor=#fefefe
| 552169 ||  || — || July 14, 2013 || Haleakala || Pan-STARRS || V || align=right data-sort-value="0.61" | 610 m || 
|-id=170 bgcolor=#d6d6d6
| 552170 ||  || — || October 13, 2002 || Palomar || NEAT || Tj (2.96) || align=right | 3.2 km || 
|-id=171 bgcolor=#d6d6d6
| 552171 ||  || — || September 23, 2008 || Kitt Peak || Spacewatch ||  || align=right | 3.2 km || 
|-id=172 bgcolor=#fefefe
| 552172 ||  || — || October 20, 2006 || Mount Lemmon || Mount Lemmon Survey ||  || align=right data-sort-value="0.62" | 620 m || 
|-id=173 bgcolor=#d6d6d6
| 552173 ||  || — || October 5, 2013 || Catalina || CSS ||  || align=right | 4.4 km || 
|-id=174 bgcolor=#d6d6d6
| 552174 ||  || — || October 12, 2007 || Mount Lemmon || Mount Lemmon Survey || EOS || align=right | 1.7 km || 
|-id=175 bgcolor=#d6d6d6
| 552175 ||  || — || October 9, 2013 || Mount Lemmon || Mount Lemmon Survey ||  || align=right | 2.3 km || 
|-id=176 bgcolor=#d6d6d6
| 552176 ||  || — || October 9, 2013 || Mount Lemmon || Mount Lemmon Survey ||  || align=right | 2.7 km || 
|-id=177 bgcolor=#C2FFFF
| 552177 ||  || — || March 31, 2008 || Mount Lemmon || Mount Lemmon Survey || L5 || align=right | 11 km || 
|-id=178 bgcolor=#d6d6d6
| 552178 ||  || — || October 1, 2013 || Mayhill-ISON || L. Elenin ||  || align=right | 3.2 km || 
|-id=179 bgcolor=#d6d6d6
| 552179 ||  || — || September 27, 2002 || Palomar || NEAT ||  || align=right | 3.5 km || 
|-id=180 bgcolor=#E9E9E9
| 552180 ||  || — || January 29, 2011 || Mount Lemmon || Mount Lemmon Survey ||  || align=right | 1.9 km || 
|-id=181 bgcolor=#fefefe
| 552181 ||  || — || August 31, 2013 || Haleakala || Pan-STARRS ||  || align=right data-sort-value="0.68" | 680 m || 
|-id=182 bgcolor=#d6d6d6
| 552182 ||  || — || September 12, 2013 || Mount Lemmon || Mount Lemmon Survey ||  || align=right | 2.7 km || 
|-id=183 bgcolor=#E9E9E9
| 552183 ||  || — || April 27, 2012 || Haleakala || Pan-STARRS ||  || align=right | 1.9 km || 
|-id=184 bgcolor=#d6d6d6
| 552184 ||  || — || October 1, 2013 || Kitt Peak || Spacewatch ||  || align=right | 2.7 km || 
|-id=185 bgcolor=#d6d6d6
| 552185 ||  || — || October 10, 2002 || Palomar || NEAT ||  || align=right | 3.2 km || 
|-id=186 bgcolor=#d6d6d6
| 552186 ||  || — || October 3, 2013 || Mount Lemmon || Mount Lemmon Survey ||  || align=right | 2.4 km || 
|-id=187 bgcolor=#d6d6d6
| 552187 ||  || — || October 3, 2013 || Haleakala || Pan-STARRS ||  || align=right | 3.2 km || 
|-id=188 bgcolor=#d6d6d6
| 552188 ||  || — || November 9, 2008 || Mount Lemmon || Mount Lemmon Survey ||  || align=right | 2.4 km || 
|-id=189 bgcolor=#fefefe
| 552189 ||  || — || February 10, 2011 || Mount Lemmon || Mount Lemmon Survey ||  || align=right data-sort-value="0.69" | 690 m || 
|-id=190 bgcolor=#d6d6d6
| 552190 ||  || — || October 3, 2013 || Kitt Peak || Spacewatch ||  || align=right | 2.5 km || 
|-id=191 bgcolor=#d6d6d6
| 552191 ||  || — || October 29, 2008 || Kitt Peak || Spacewatch ||  || align=right | 2.4 km || 
|-id=192 bgcolor=#d6d6d6
| 552192 ||  || — || November 26, 2014 || Haleakala || Pan-STARRS ||  || align=right | 2.8 km || 
|-id=193 bgcolor=#fefefe
| 552193 ||  || — || October 5, 2013 || Haleakala || Pan-STARRS ||  || align=right data-sort-value="0.65" | 650 m || 
|-id=194 bgcolor=#d6d6d6
| 552194 ||  || — || October 2, 2013 || Haleakala || Pan-STARRS ||  || align=right | 2.4 km || 
|-id=195 bgcolor=#fefefe
| 552195 ||  || — || October 14, 2013 || Catalina || CSS ||  || align=right | 1.1 km || 
|-id=196 bgcolor=#fefefe
| 552196 ||  || — || October 8, 2013 || Mount Lemmon || Mount Lemmon Survey ||  || align=right data-sort-value="0.75" | 750 m || 
|-id=197 bgcolor=#d6d6d6
| 552197 ||  || — || October 2, 2013 || Mount Lemmon || Mount Lemmon Survey ||  || align=right | 2.7 km || 
|-id=198 bgcolor=#d6d6d6
| 552198 ||  || — || January 19, 2015 || Haleakala || Pan-STARRS ||  || align=right | 2.8 km || 
|-id=199 bgcolor=#d6d6d6
| 552199 ||  || — || January 13, 2015 || Haleakala || Pan-STARRS ||  || align=right | 2.7 km || 
|-id=200 bgcolor=#d6d6d6
| 552200 ||  || — || October 12, 2013 || Kitt Peak || Spacewatch ||  || align=right | 2.5 km || 
|}

552201–552300 

|-bgcolor=#d6d6d6
| 552201 ||  || — || October 2, 2013 || Haleakala || Pan-STARRS ||  || align=right | 2.3 km || 
|-id=202 bgcolor=#d6d6d6
| 552202 ||  || — || September 29, 2013 || Mount Lemmon || Mount Lemmon Survey ||  || align=right | 2.4 km || 
|-id=203 bgcolor=#d6d6d6
| 552203 ||  || — || October 14, 2013 || Kitt Peak || Spacewatch ||  || align=right | 2.8 km || 
|-id=204 bgcolor=#d6d6d6
| 552204 ||  || — || October 15, 2013 || Mount Lemmon || Mount Lemmon Survey ||  || align=right | 2.9 km || 
|-id=205 bgcolor=#d6d6d6
| 552205 ||  || — || October 1, 2013 || Kitt Peak || Spacewatch ||  || align=right | 2.5 km || 
|-id=206 bgcolor=#d6d6d6
| 552206 ||  || — || October 15, 2013 || Kitt Peak || Spacewatch ||  || align=right | 2.7 km || 
|-id=207 bgcolor=#d6d6d6
| 552207 ||  || — || October 3, 2013 || Mount Lemmon || Mount Lemmon Survey ||  || align=right | 2.8 km || 
|-id=208 bgcolor=#d6d6d6
| 552208 ||  || — || October 9, 2013 || Mount Lemmon || Mount Lemmon Survey ||  || align=right | 2.1 km || 
|-id=209 bgcolor=#fefefe
| 552209 ||  || — || October 5, 2013 || Haleakala || Pan-STARRS ||  || align=right data-sort-value="0.57" | 570 m || 
|-id=210 bgcolor=#d6d6d6
| 552210 ||  || — || October 5, 2013 || Kitt Peak || Spacewatch ||  || align=right | 2.4 km || 
|-id=211 bgcolor=#d6d6d6
| 552211 ||  || — || October 1, 2013 || Mount Lemmon || Mount Lemmon Survey ||  || align=right | 2.8 km || 
|-id=212 bgcolor=#d6d6d6
| 552212 ||  || — || October 21, 2008 || Mount Lemmon || Mount Lemmon Survey ||  || align=right | 3.2 km || 
|-id=213 bgcolor=#fefefe
| 552213 ||  || — || October 27, 2013 || Elena Remote || A. Oreshko ||  || align=right data-sort-value="0.78" | 780 m || 
|-id=214 bgcolor=#d6d6d6
| 552214 ||  || — || March 16, 2004 || Catalina || CSS ||  || align=right | 3.0 km || 
|-id=215 bgcolor=#d6d6d6
| 552215 ||  || — || October 3, 2013 || Kitt Peak || Spacewatch ||  || align=right | 2.7 km || 
|-id=216 bgcolor=#d6d6d6
| 552216 ||  || — || December 25, 2003 || Apache Point || SDSS Collaboration ||  || align=right | 4.0 km || 
|-id=217 bgcolor=#d6d6d6
| 552217 ||  || — || October 24, 2013 || Mount Lemmon || Mount Lemmon Survey ||  || align=right | 2.7 km || 
|-id=218 bgcolor=#d6d6d6
| 552218 ||  || — || October 16, 2013 || Mount Lemmon || Mount Lemmon Survey ||  || align=right | 2.8 km || 
|-id=219 bgcolor=#d6d6d6
| 552219 ||  || — || October 25, 2013 || Kitt Peak || Spacewatch ||  || align=right | 3.1 km || 
|-id=220 bgcolor=#d6d6d6
| 552220 ||  || — || December 6, 2008 || Kitt Peak || Spacewatch ||  || align=right | 3.1 km || 
|-id=221 bgcolor=#d6d6d6
| 552221 ||  || — || December 21, 2014 || Haleakala || Pan-STARRS ||  || align=right | 2.4 km || 
|-id=222 bgcolor=#d6d6d6
| 552222 ||  || — || October 31, 2013 || Mount Lemmon || Mount Lemmon Survey ||  || align=right | 2.9 km || 
|-id=223 bgcolor=#d6d6d6
| 552223 ||  || — || March 13, 2016 || Haleakala || Pan-STARRS ||  || align=right | 2.3 km || 
|-id=224 bgcolor=#fefefe
| 552224 ||  || — || October 24, 2013 || Kitt Peak || Spacewatch ||  || align=right data-sort-value="0.71" | 710 m || 
|-id=225 bgcolor=#d6d6d6
| 552225 ||  || — || October 25, 2013 || Mount Lemmon || Mount Lemmon Survey ||  || align=right | 2.5 km || 
|-id=226 bgcolor=#C2FFFF
| 552226 ||  || — || October 28, 2013 || Mount Lemmon || Mount Lemmon Survey || L5 || align=right | 7.7 km || 
|-id=227 bgcolor=#d6d6d6
| 552227 ||  || — || October 26, 2013 || Catalina || CSS ||  || align=right | 3.2 km || 
|-id=228 bgcolor=#d6d6d6
| 552228 ||  || — || October 26, 2013 || Mount Lemmon || Mount Lemmon Survey ||  || align=right | 2.4 km || 
|-id=229 bgcolor=#d6d6d6
| 552229 ||  || — || October 28, 2013 || Kitt Peak || Spacewatch ||  || align=right | 2.9 km || 
|-id=230 bgcolor=#d6d6d6
| 552230 ||  || — || October 24, 2013 || Mount Lemmon || Mount Lemmon Survey ||  || align=right | 2.5 km || 
|-id=231 bgcolor=#d6d6d6
| 552231 ||  || — || October 24, 2013 || Mount Lemmon || Mount Lemmon Survey ||  || align=right | 2.4 km || 
|-id=232 bgcolor=#d6d6d6
| 552232 ||  || — || October 27, 2013 || Mount Lemmon || Mount Lemmon Survey ||  || align=right | 2.8 km || 
|-id=233 bgcolor=#d6d6d6
| 552233 ||  || — || October 3, 2002 || Palomar || NEAT ||  || align=right | 3.2 km || 
|-id=234 bgcolor=#d6d6d6
| 552234 ||  || — || October 27, 2008 || Mount Lemmon || Mount Lemmon Survey ||  || align=right | 2.5 km || 
|-id=235 bgcolor=#d6d6d6
| 552235 ||  || — || October 15, 2002 || Palomar || NEAT ||  || align=right | 3.2 km || 
|-id=236 bgcolor=#d6d6d6
| 552236 ||  || — || October 3, 2013 || Haleakala || Pan-STARRS ||  || align=right | 3.2 km || 
|-id=237 bgcolor=#d6d6d6
| 552237 ||  || — || November 1, 2002 || Palomar || NEAT || EOS || align=right | 2.3 km || 
|-id=238 bgcolor=#d6d6d6
| 552238 ||  || — || March 10, 2005 || Mount Lemmon || Mount Lemmon Survey ||  || align=right | 2.8 km || 
|-id=239 bgcolor=#d6d6d6
| 552239 ||  || — || July 13, 2013 || Haleakala || Pan-STARRS ||  || align=right | 3.7 km || 
|-id=240 bgcolor=#d6d6d6
| 552240 ||  || — || May 27, 2012 || Mount Lemmon || Mount Lemmon Survey ||  || align=right | 4.2 km || 
|-id=241 bgcolor=#d6d6d6
| 552241 ||  || — || October 26, 2013 || Elena Remote || A. Oreshko ||  || align=right | 3.2 km || 
|-id=242 bgcolor=#d6d6d6
| 552242 ||  || — || December 7, 2002 || Desert Eagle || W. K. Y. Yeung ||  || align=right | 3.5 km || 
|-id=243 bgcolor=#fefefe
| 552243 ||  || — || September 13, 2002 || Palomar || NEAT || MAS || align=right data-sort-value="0.75" | 750 m || 
|-id=244 bgcolor=#fefefe
| 552244 ||  || — || November 13, 2002 || Palomar || NEAT || MAS || align=right data-sort-value="0.71" | 710 m || 
|-id=245 bgcolor=#fefefe
| 552245 ||  || — || December 27, 2006 || Mount Lemmon || Mount Lemmon Survey ||  || align=right data-sort-value="0.80" | 800 m || 
|-id=246 bgcolor=#fefefe
| 552246 ||  || — || January 4, 2011 || Mount Lemmon || Mount Lemmon Survey ||  || align=right data-sort-value="0.62" | 620 m || 
|-id=247 bgcolor=#d6d6d6
| 552247 ||  || — || October 26, 2013 || Catalina || CSS || Tj (2.99) || align=right | 3.9 km || 
|-id=248 bgcolor=#fefefe
| 552248 ||  || — || November 22, 2006 || Mount Lemmon || Mount Lemmon Survey ||  || align=right data-sort-value="0.86" | 860 m || 
|-id=249 bgcolor=#fefefe
| 552249 ||  || — || July 5, 2005 || Mount Lemmon || Mount Lemmon Survey || NYS || align=right data-sort-value="0.79" | 790 m || 
|-id=250 bgcolor=#d6d6d6
| 552250 ||  || — || September 15, 2007 || Catalina || CSS ||  || align=right | 3.5 km || 
|-id=251 bgcolor=#d6d6d6
| 552251 ||  || — || June 6, 2011 || Mount Lemmon || Mount Lemmon Survey ||  || align=right | 3.4 km || 
|-id=252 bgcolor=#d6d6d6
| 552252 ||  || — || November 8, 2013 || Mount Lemmon || Mount Lemmon Survey ||  || align=right | 2.9 km || 
|-id=253 bgcolor=#d6d6d6
| 552253 ||  || — || November 9, 2013 || Haleakala || Pan-STARRS ||  || align=right | 2.8 km || 
|-id=254 bgcolor=#d6d6d6
| 552254 ||  || — || November 12, 2013 || Kitt Peak || Spacewatch ||  || align=right | 2.7 km || 
|-id=255 bgcolor=#fefefe
| 552255 ||  || — || November 12, 2013 || Mount Lemmon || Mount Lemmon Survey ||  || align=right data-sort-value="0.57" | 570 m || 
|-id=256 bgcolor=#fefefe
| 552256 ||  || — || November 8, 2013 || Kitt Peak || Spacewatch ||  || align=right data-sort-value="0.65" | 650 m || 
|-id=257 bgcolor=#d6d6d6
| 552257 ||  || — || February 5, 2016 || Haleakala || Pan-STARRS ||  || align=right | 3.0 km || 
|-id=258 bgcolor=#d6d6d6
| 552258 ||  || — || November 2, 2013 || Mount Lemmon || Mount Lemmon Survey ||  || align=right | 2.7 km || 
|-id=259 bgcolor=#d6d6d6
| 552259 ||  || — || November 6, 2013 || Mount Lemmon || Mount Lemmon Survey ||  || align=right | 2.3 km || 
|-id=260 bgcolor=#d6d6d6
| 552260 ||  || — || November 2, 2013 || Mount Lemmon || Mount Lemmon Survey ||  || align=right | 2.7 km || 
|-id=261 bgcolor=#d6d6d6
| 552261 ||  || — || November 9, 2013 || Mount Lemmon || Mount Lemmon Survey ||  || align=right | 2.9 km || 
|-id=262 bgcolor=#d6d6d6
| 552262 ||  || — || November 6, 2013 || Haleakala || Pan-STARRS ||  || align=right | 2.8 km || 
|-id=263 bgcolor=#d6d6d6
| 552263 ||  || — || November 12, 2013 || Kitt Peak || Spacewatch ||  || align=right | 3.1 km || 
|-id=264 bgcolor=#fefefe
| 552264 ||  || — || November 14, 2013 || Mount Lemmon || Mount Lemmon Survey ||  || align=right data-sort-value="0.47" | 470 m || 
|-id=265 bgcolor=#d6d6d6
| 552265 ||  || — || November 9, 2013 || Haleakala || Pan-STARRS ||  || align=right | 3.1 km || 
|-id=266 bgcolor=#d6d6d6
| 552266 ||  || — || November 10, 2013 || Mount Lemmon || Mount Lemmon Survey ||  || align=right | 2.7 km || 
|-id=267 bgcolor=#d6d6d6
| 552267 ||  || — || November 9, 2013 || Haleakala || Pan-STARRS ||  || align=right | 2.8 km || 
|-id=268 bgcolor=#d6d6d6
| 552268 ||  || — || November 1, 2013 || Kitt Peak || Spacewatch ||  || align=right | 2.5 km || 
|-id=269 bgcolor=#d6d6d6
| 552269 ||  || — || November 9, 2013 || Mount Lemmon || Mount Lemmon Survey ||  || align=right | 2.7 km || 
|-id=270 bgcolor=#d6d6d6
| 552270 ||  || — || October 14, 2013 || Mount Lemmon || Mount Lemmon Survey ||  || align=right | 2.2 km || 
|-id=271 bgcolor=#d6d6d6
| 552271 ||  || — || November 10, 2013 || Mount Lemmon || Mount Lemmon Survey || 7:4 || align=right | 3.3 km || 
|-id=272 bgcolor=#FA8072
| 552272 ||  || — || August 13, 2006 || Palomar || NEAT ||  || align=right | 1.4 km || 
|-id=273 bgcolor=#d6d6d6
| 552273 ||  || — || February 16, 2004 || Kitt Peak || Spacewatch ||  || align=right | 3.4 km || 
|-id=274 bgcolor=#d6d6d6
| 552274 ||  || — || November 25, 2013 || XuYi || PMO NEO ||  || align=right | 3.1 km || 
|-id=275 bgcolor=#d6d6d6
| 552275 ||  || — || November 25, 2013 || Nogales || M. Schwartz, P. R. Holvorcem ||  || align=right | 4.0 km || 
|-id=276 bgcolor=#d6d6d6
| 552276 ||  || — || March 18, 2004 || Palomar || NEAT ||  || align=right | 3.0 km || 
|-id=277 bgcolor=#fefefe
| 552277 ||  || — || December 15, 2006 || Kitt Peak || Spacewatch ||  || align=right data-sort-value="0.71" | 710 m || 
|-id=278 bgcolor=#fefefe
| 552278 ||  || — || October 28, 2006 || Kitt Peak || Spacewatch ||  || align=right data-sort-value="0.78" | 780 m || 
|-id=279 bgcolor=#d6d6d6
| 552279 ||  || — || October 26, 2013 || Mount Lemmon || Mount Lemmon Survey ||  || align=right | 2.4 km || 
|-id=280 bgcolor=#d6d6d6
| 552280 ||  || — || November 27, 2013 || Haleakala || Pan-STARRS ||  || align=right | 3.0 km || 
|-id=281 bgcolor=#d6d6d6
| 552281 ||  || — || October 9, 2013 || Mount Lemmon || Mount Lemmon Survey ||  || align=right | 2.9 km || 
|-id=282 bgcolor=#d6d6d6
| 552282 ||  || — || November 6, 2013 || Haleakala || Pan-STARRS || 7:4 || align=right | 2.7 km || 
|-id=283 bgcolor=#d6d6d6
| 552283 ||  || — || June 4, 2011 || Mount Lemmon || Mount Lemmon Survey ||  || align=right | 2.9 km || 
|-id=284 bgcolor=#fefefe
| 552284 ||  || — || May 6, 2008 || Sierra Stars || W. G. Dillon || PHO || align=right | 3.5 km || 
|-id=285 bgcolor=#fefefe
| 552285 ||  || — || May 29, 2009 || Mount Lemmon || Mount Lemmon Survey ||  || align=right | 1.0 km || 
|-id=286 bgcolor=#fefefe
| 552286 ||  || — || October 8, 2013 || Mount Lemmon || Mount Lemmon Survey ||  || align=right data-sort-value="0.65" | 650 m || 
|-id=287 bgcolor=#d6d6d6
| 552287 ||  || — || December 19, 2003 || Kitt Peak || Spacewatch ||  || align=right | 2.8 km || 
|-id=288 bgcolor=#d6d6d6
| 552288 ||  || — || November 26, 2013 || Haleakala || Pan-STARRS ||  || align=right | 3.3 km || 
|-id=289 bgcolor=#d6d6d6
| 552289 ||  || — || December 22, 2008 || Kitt Peak || Spacewatch || THM || align=right | 1.8 km || 
|-id=290 bgcolor=#fefefe
| 552290 ||  || — || September 12, 2013 || Mount Lemmon || Mount Lemmon Survey ||  || align=right data-sort-value="0.65" | 650 m || 
|-id=291 bgcolor=#d6d6d6
| 552291 ||  || — || August 26, 2012 || Haleakala || Pan-STARRS ||  || align=right | 2.2 km || 
|-id=292 bgcolor=#d6d6d6
| 552292 ||  || — || January 17, 2009 || Mount Lemmon || Mount Lemmon Survey ||  || align=right | 3.2 km || 
|-id=293 bgcolor=#fefefe
| 552293 ||  || — || November 28, 2013 || Kitt Peak || Spacewatch ||  || align=right data-sort-value="0.59" | 590 m || 
|-id=294 bgcolor=#d6d6d6
| 552294 ||  || — || July 28, 2012 || Haleakala || Pan-STARRS ||  || align=right | 3.1 km || 
|-id=295 bgcolor=#d6d6d6
| 552295 ||  || — || March 16, 2004 || Kitt Peak || Spacewatch ||  || align=right | 2.9 km || 
|-id=296 bgcolor=#d6d6d6
| 552296 ||  || — || October 3, 2013 || Mount Lemmon || Mount Lemmon Survey ||  || align=right | 2.7 km || 
|-id=297 bgcolor=#fefefe
| 552297 ||  || — || September 18, 2003 || Kitt Peak || Spacewatch ||  || align=right data-sort-value="0.78" | 780 m || 
|-id=298 bgcolor=#d6d6d6
| 552298 ||  || — || November 28, 2013 || Mount Lemmon || Mount Lemmon Survey ||  || align=right | 2.8 km || 
|-id=299 bgcolor=#d6d6d6
| 552299 ||  || — || October 9, 2007 || Mount Lemmon || Mount Lemmon Survey ||  || align=right | 2.9 km || 
|-id=300 bgcolor=#FA8072
| 552300 ||  || — || October 31, 2002 || Haleakala || AMOS ||  || align=right | 1.0 km || 
|}

552301–552400 

|-bgcolor=#d6d6d6
| 552301 ||  || — || July 14, 2013 || Haleakala || Pan-STARRS ||  || align=right | 3.9 km || 
|-id=302 bgcolor=#d6d6d6
| 552302 ||  || — || February 11, 2004 || Kitt Peak || Spacewatch ||  || align=right | 2.8 km || 
|-id=303 bgcolor=#d6d6d6
| 552303 ||  || — || October 5, 2007 || Kitt Peak || Spacewatch ||  || align=right | 3.1 km || 
|-id=304 bgcolor=#d6d6d6
| 552304 ||  || — || April 9, 2010 || Mount Lemmon || Mount Lemmon Survey ||  || align=right | 3.2 km || 
|-id=305 bgcolor=#d6d6d6
| 552305 ||  || — || November 25, 2013 || Haleakala || Pan-STARRS ||  || align=right | 2.7 km || 
|-id=306 bgcolor=#d6d6d6
| 552306 ||  || — || November 11, 2013 || Mount Lemmon || Mount Lemmon Survey ||  || align=right | 2.3 km || 
|-id=307 bgcolor=#fefefe
| 552307 ||  || — || August 31, 2005 || Kitt Peak || Spacewatch ||  || align=right | 1.0 km || 
|-id=308 bgcolor=#d6d6d6
| 552308 ||  || — || March 19, 2004 || Palomar || NEAT ||  || align=right | 3.4 km || 
|-id=309 bgcolor=#d6d6d6
| 552309 ||  || — || November 16, 2002 || Palomar || NEAT ||  || align=right | 3.1 km || 
|-id=310 bgcolor=#fefefe
| 552310 ||  || — || November 9, 2013 || Haleakala || Pan-STARRS ||  || align=right data-sort-value="0.85" | 850 m || 
|-id=311 bgcolor=#d6d6d6
| 552311 ||  || — || October 8, 2013 || Mount Lemmon || Mount Lemmon Survey ||  || align=right | 3.5 km || 
|-id=312 bgcolor=#fefefe
| 552312 ||  || — || January 26, 2007 || Kitt Peak || Spacewatch ||  || align=right data-sort-value="0.90" | 900 m || 
|-id=313 bgcolor=#fefefe
| 552313 ||  || — || October 8, 2013 || Mount Lemmon || Mount Lemmon Survey ||  || align=right data-sort-value="0.54" | 540 m || 
|-id=314 bgcolor=#fefefe
| 552314 ||  || — || January 27, 2003 || Palomar || NEAT ||  || align=right | 1.0 km || 
|-id=315 bgcolor=#fefefe
| 552315 ||  || — || September 20, 2003 || Palomar || NEAT ||  || align=right data-sort-value="0.75" | 750 m || 
|-id=316 bgcolor=#d6d6d6
| 552316 ||  || — || November 27, 2013 || Haleakala || Pan-STARRS ||  || align=right | 3.2 km || 
|-id=317 bgcolor=#d6d6d6
| 552317 ||  || — || September 22, 2012 || Mount Lemmon || Mount Lemmon Survey ||  || align=right | 3.1 km || 
|-id=318 bgcolor=#FA8072
| 552318 ||  || — || August 28, 2006 || Siding Spring || SSS ||  || align=right data-sort-value="0.90" | 900 m || 
|-id=319 bgcolor=#d6d6d6
| 552319 ||  || — || November 10, 2013 || Kitt Peak || Spacewatch ||  || align=right | 2.9 km || 
|-id=320 bgcolor=#d6d6d6
| 552320 ||  || — || November 8, 2013 || Mount Lemmon || Mount Lemmon Survey ||  || align=right | 2.7 km || 
|-id=321 bgcolor=#d6d6d6
| 552321 ||  || — || May 9, 2000 || Kitt Peak || Spacewatch ||  || align=right | 2.7 km || 
|-id=322 bgcolor=#d6d6d6
| 552322 ||  || — || October 16, 2007 || Mount Lemmon || Mount Lemmon Survey ||  || align=right | 3.4 km || 
|-id=323 bgcolor=#d6d6d6
| 552323 ||  || — || November 11, 2013 || Oukaimeden || M. Ory ||  || align=right | 3.1 km || 
|-id=324 bgcolor=#fefefe
| 552324 ||  || — || January 26, 2003 || Haleakala || AMOS ||  || align=right data-sort-value="0.96" | 960 m || 
|-id=325 bgcolor=#fefefe
| 552325 ||  || — || November 26, 2013 || Haleakala || Pan-STARRS ||  || align=right data-sort-value="0.78" | 780 m || 
|-id=326 bgcolor=#d6d6d6
| 552326 ||  || — || December 22, 2008 || Kitt Peak || Spacewatch ||  || align=right | 2.4 km || 
|-id=327 bgcolor=#d6d6d6
| 552327 ||  || — || November 7, 2013 || Kitt Peak || Spacewatch ||  || align=right | 3.4 km || 
|-id=328 bgcolor=#E9E9E9
| 552328 ||  || — || January 2, 2001 || Socorro || LINEAR || EUN || align=right | 1.6 km || 
|-id=329 bgcolor=#E9E9E9
| 552329 ||  || — || July 16, 2004 || Cerro Tololo || Cerro Tololo Obs. ||  || align=right data-sort-value="0.90" | 900 m || 
|-id=330 bgcolor=#d6d6d6
| 552330 ||  || — || September 22, 2012 || Mount Lemmon || Mount Lemmon Survey ||  || align=right | 3.0 km || 
|-id=331 bgcolor=#E9E9E9
| 552331 ||  || — || October 6, 2008 || Kitt Peak || Spacewatch ||  || align=right | 2.4 km || 
|-id=332 bgcolor=#d6d6d6
| 552332 ||  || — || October 27, 2013 || Catalina || CSS ||  || align=right | 3.5 km || 
|-id=333 bgcolor=#d6d6d6
| 552333 ||  || — || April 7, 2005 || Kitt Peak || Spacewatch ||  || align=right | 3.7 km || 
|-id=334 bgcolor=#d6d6d6
| 552334 ||  || — || November 28, 2013 || Mount Lemmon || Mount Lemmon Survey ||  || align=right | 2.8 km || 
|-id=335 bgcolor=#d6d6d6
| 552335 ||  || — || August 6, 2012 || Haleakala || Pan-STARRS ||  || align=right | 2.8 km || 
|-id=336 bgcolor=#d6d6d6
| 552336 ||  || — || October 10, 2007 || Kitt Peak || Spacewatch ||  || align=right | 3.2 km || 
|-id=337 bgcolor=#d6d6d6
| 552337 ||  || — || November 28, 2013 || Mount Lemmon || Mount Lemmon Survey ||  || align=right | 3.1 km || 
|-id=338 bgcolor=#d6d6d6
| 552338 ||  || — || November 17, 2007 || Mount Lemmon || Mount Lemmon Survey ||  || align=right | 3.1 km || 
|-id=339 bgcolor=#fefefe
| 552339 ||  || — || November 20, 2003 || Palomar || NEAT ||  || align=right data-sort-value="0.78" | 780 m || 
|-id=340 bgcolor=#d6d6d6
| 552340 ||  || — || March 17, 2005 || Mount Lemmon || Mount Lemmon Survey ||  || align=right | 3.3 km || 
|-id=341 bgcolor=#fefefe
| 552341 ||  || — || November 29, 2013 || Mount Lemmon || Mount Lemmon Survey ||  || align=right data-sort-value="0.78" | 780 m || 
|-id=342 bgcolor=#d6d6d6
| 552342 ||  || — || October 15, 2007 || Kitt Peak || Spacewatch ||  || align=right | 2.7 km || 
|-id=343 bgcolor=#d6d6d6
| 552343 ||  || — || October 31, 2013 || Piszkesteto || K. Sárneczky ||  || align=right | 2.8 km || 
|-id=344 bgcolor=#fefefe
| 552344 ||  || — || October 29, 1999 || Kitt Peak || Spacewatch ||  || align=right data-sort-value="0.57" | 570 m || 
|-id=345 bgcolor=#d6d6d6
| 552345 ||  || — || April 24, 2011 || Mount Lemmon || Mount Lemmon Survey ||  || align=right | 3.7 km || 
|-id=346 bgcolor=#d6d6d6
| 552346 ||  || — || September 14, 2002 || Palomar || NEAT ||  || align=right | 3.2 km || 
|-id=347 bgcolor=#d6d6d6
| 552347 ||  || — || October 26, 2013 || Mount Lemmon || Mount Lemmon Survey ||  || align=right | 3.1 km || 
|-id=348 bgcolor=#d6d6d6
| 552348 ||  || — || October 10, 2007 || Kitt Peak || Spacewatch ||  || align=right | 2.2 km || 
|-id=349 bgcolor=#fefefe
| 552349 ||  || — || November 29, 2013 || Haleakala || Pan-STARRS ||  || align=right data-sort-value="0.65" | 650 m || 
|-id=350 bgcolor=#fefefe
| 552350 ||  || — || November 25, 2013 || Haleakala || Pan-STARRS ||  || align=right data-sort-value="0.86" | 860 m || 
|-id=351 bgcolor=#d6d6d6
| 552351 ||  || — || November 28, 2013 || Mount Lemmon || Mount Lemmon Survey ||  || align=right | 3.1 km || 
|-id=352 bgcolor=#d6d6d6
| 552352 ||  || — || November 27, 2013 || Haleakala || Pan-STARRS ||  || align=right | 2.4 km || 
|-id=353 bgcolor=#d6d6d6
| 552353 ||  || — || January 16, 2015 || Haleakala || Pan-STARRS ||  || align=right | 2.9 km || 
|-id=354 bgcolor=#C2FFFF
| 552354 ||  || — || February 4, 2017 || Haleakala || Pan-STARRS || L5 || align=right | 6.7 km || 
|-id=355 bgcolor=#d6d6d6
| 552355 ||  || — || June 21, 2012 || Kitt Peak || Spacewatch ||  || align=right | 3.1 km || 
|-id=356 bgcolor=#fefefe
| 552356 ||  || — || November 27, 2013 || Haleakala || Pan-STARRS ||  || align=right data-sort-value="0.57" | 570 m || 
|-id=357 bgcolor=#d6d6d6
| 552357 ||  || — || November 27, 2013 || Haleakala || Pan-STARRS ||  || align=right | 2.8 km || 
|-id=358 bgcolor=#d6d6d6
| 552358 ||  || — || November 28, 2013 || Mount Lemmon || Mount Lemmon Survey ||  || align=right | 2.5 km || 
|-id=359 bgcolor=#d6d6d6
| 552359 ||  || — || November 27, 2013 || Haleakala || Pan-STARRS ||  || align=right | 2.4 km || 
|-id=360 bgcolor=#fefefe
| 552360 ||  || — || November 27, 2013 || Haleakala || Pan-STARRS ||  || align=right data-sort-value="0.52" | 520 m || 
|-id=361 bgcolor=#d6d6d6
| 552361 ||  || — || December 3, 2013 || Haleakala || Pan-STARRS ||  || align=right | 3.5 km || 
|-id=362 bgcolor=#FA8072
| 552362 ||  || — || January 14, 2004 || Palomar || NEAT ||  || align=right | 1.3 km || 
|-id=363 bgcolor=#fefefe
| 552363 ||  || — || December 5, 2013 || Haleakala || Pan-STARRS || H || align=right data-sort-value="0.57" | 570 m || 
|-id=364 bgcolor=#d6d6d6
| 552364 ||  || — || October 11, 2007 || Mount Lemmon || Mount Lemmon Survey ||  || align=right | 2.4 km || 
|-id=365 bgcolor=#d6d6d6
| 552365 ||  || — || November 2, 2007 || Mount Lemmon || Mount Lemmon Survey || Tj (2.99) || align=right | 3.1 km || 
|-id=366 bgcolor=#d6d6d6
| 552366 ||  || — || October 19, 2007 || Catalina || CSS ||  || align=right | 2.5 km || 
|-id=367 bgcolor=#fefefe
| 552367 ||  || — || October 4, 2006 || Mount Lemmon || Mount Lemmon Survey ||  || align=right data-sort-value="0.94" | 940 m || 
|-id=368 bgcolor=#fefefe
| 552368 ||  || — || September 21, 2001 || Apache Point || SDSS Collaboration ||  || align=right data-sort-value="0.90" | 900 m || 
|-id=369 bgcolor=#fefefe
| 552369 ||  || — || February 10, 2011 || Mount Lemmon || Mount Lemmon Survey ||  || align=right data-sort-value="0.57" | 570 m || 
|-id=370 bgcolor=#d6d6d6
| 552370 ||  || — || May 23, 2006 || Mount Lemmon || Mount Lemmon Survey ||  || align=right | 3.7 km || 
|-id=371 bgcolor=#fefefe
| 552371 ||  || — || September 21, 2009 || Mount Lemmon || Mount Lemmon Survey ||  || align=right data-sort-value="0.75" | 750 m || 
|-id=372 bgcolor=#fefefe
| 552372 ||  || — || January 7, 2003 || Socorro || LINEAR ||  || align=right | 1.6 km || 
|-id=373 bgcolor=#fefefe
| 552373 ||  || — || November 14, 2006 || Mount Lemmon || Mount Lemmon Survey ||  || align=right data-sort-value="0.82" | 820 m || 
|-id=374 bgcolor=#fefefe
| 552374 ||  || — || December 10, 2006 || Kitt Peak || Spacewatch ||  || align=right data-sort-value="0.75" | 750 m || 
|-id=375 bgcolor=#fefefe
| 552375 ||  || — || December 13, 2013 || Mount Lemmon || Mount Lemmon Survey ||  || align=right data-sort-value="0.94" | 940 m || 
|-id=376 bgcolor=#d6d6d6
| 552376 ||  || — || November 28, 2013 || Mount Lemmon || Mount Lemmon Survey ||  || align=right | 3.1 km || 
|-id=377 bgcolor=#fefefe
| 552377 ||  || — || September 26, 2009 || Mount Lemmon || Mount Lemmon Survey ||  || align=right data-sort-value="0.68" | 680 m || 
|-id=378 bgcolor=#fefefe
| 552378 ||  || — || November 17, 2009 || Kitt Peak || Spacewatch ||  || align=right data-sort-value="0.82" | 820 m || 
|-id=379 bgcolor=#fefefe
| 552379 ||  || — || December 25, 2003 || Apache Point || SDSS Collaboration ||  || align=right data-sort-value="0.82" | 820 m || 
|-id=380 bgcolor=#E9E9E9
| 552380 ||  || — || October 27, 2008 || Kitt Peak || Spacewatch || EUN || align=right | 1.2 km || 
|-id=381 bgcolor=#d6d6d6
| 552381 ||  || — || February 21, 2003 || Palomar || NEAT || HYG || align=right | 3.6 km || 
|-id=382 bgcolor=#fefefe
| 552382 ||  || — || December 24, 2013 || Mount Lemmon || Mount Lemmon Survey ||  || align=right data-sort-value="0.78" | 780 m || 
|-id=383 bgcolor=#fefefe
| 552383 ||  || — || December 24, 2013 || Mount Lemmon || Mount Lemmon Survey ||  || align=right data-sort-value="0.62" | 620 m || 
|-id=384 bgcolor=#fefefe
| 552384 ||  || — || February 11, 2011 || Mount Lemmon || Mount Lemmon Survey ||  || align=right data-sort-value="0.65" | 650 m || 
|-id=385 bgcolor=#d6d6d6
| 552385 Rochechouart ||  ||  || December 25, 2013 || Nogales || J.-C. Merlin ||  || align=right | 3.6 km || 
|-id=386 bgcolor=#d6d6d6
| 552386 ||  || — || November 28, 2013 || Mount Lemmon || Mount Lemmon Survey ||  || align=right | 3.2 km || 
|-id=387 bgcolor=#fefefe
| 552387 ||  || — || December 25, 2013 || Haleakala || Pan-STARRS || H || align=right data-sort-value="0.83" | 830 m || 
|-id=388 bgcolor=#fefefe
| 552388 ||  || — || December 4, 2013 || Haleakala || Pan-STARRS || H || align=right data-sort-value="0.62" | 620 m || 
|-id=389 bgcolor=#d6d6d6
| 552389 ||  || — || November 20, 2008 || Kitt Peak || Spacewatch ||  || align=right | 3.2 km || 
|-id=390 bgcolor=#d6d6d6
| 552390 ||  || — || April 9, 2010 || Catalina || CSS ||  || align=right | 3.6 km || 
|-id=391 bgcolor=#fefefe
| 552391 ||  || — || January 18, 2004 || Palomar || NEAT ||  || align=right data-sort-value="0.94" | 940 m || 
|-id=392 bgcolor=#d6d6d6
| 552392 ||  || — || November 12, 2007 || Catalina || CSS ||  || align=right | 3.3 km || 
|-id=393 bgcolor=#d6d6d6
| 552393 ||  || — || December 26, 2013 || Mount Lemmon || Mount Lemmon Survey ||  || align=right | 3.1 km || 
|-id=394 bgcolor=#d6d6d6
| 552394 ||  || — || November 2, 2013 || Kitt Peak || Spacewatch ||  || align=right | 3.7 km || 
|-id=395 bgcolor=#d6d6d6
| 552395 ||  || — || October 8, 2007 || Mount Lemmon || Mount Lemmon Survey ||  || align=right | 3.1 km || 
|-id=396 bgcolor=#d6d6d6
| 552396 ||  || — || November 27, 2013 || Haleakala || Pan-STARRS ||  || align=right | 3.1 km || 
|-id=397 bgcolor=#fefefe
| 552397 ||  || — || March 29, 2008 || Kitt Peak || Spacewatch ||  || align=right data-sort-value="0.78" | 780 m || 
|-id=398 bgcolor=#d6d6d6
| 552398 ||  || — || November 28, 2013 || Mount Lemmon || Mount Lemmon Survey ||  || align=right | 2.7 km || 
|-id=399 bgcolor=#fefefe
| 552399 ||  || — || November 17, 2006 || Kitt Peak || Spacewatch ||  || align=right data-sort-value="0.94" | 940 m || 
|-id=400 bgcolor=#fefefe
| 552400 ||  || — || April 13, 2011 || Mount Lemmon || Mount Lemmon Survey ||  || align=right data-sort-value="0.62" | 620 m || 
|}

552401–552500 

|-bgcolor=#d6d6d6
| 552401 ||  || — || October 9, 2007 || Kitt Peak || Spacewatch || HYG || align=right | 2.5 km || 
|-id=402 bgcolor=#fefefe
| 552402 ||  || — || May 7, 2002 || Palomar || NEAT ||  || align=right data-sort-value="0.78" | 780 m || 
|-id=403 bgcolor=#d6d6d6
| 552403 ||  || — || October 9, 2007 || Kitt Peak || Spacewatch ||  || align=right | 2.5 km || 
|-id=404 bgcolor=#fefefe
| 552404 ||  || — || November 29, 2013 || Mount Lemmon || Mount Lemmon Survey ||  || align=right data-sort-value="0.94" | 940 m || 
|-id=405 bgcolor=#d6d6d6
| 552405 ||  || — || December 5, 2007 || Mount Lemmon || Mount Lemmon Survey ||  || align=right | 3.8 km || 
|-id=406 bgcolor=#fefefe
| 552406 ||  || — || March 31, 2008 || Kitt Peak || Spacewatch ||  || align=right data-sort-value="0.65" | 650 m || 
|-id=407 bgcolor=#fefefe
| 552407 ||  || — || December 10, 2013 || Mount Lemmon || Mount Lemmon Survey ||  || align=right data-sort-value="0.71" | 710 m || 
|-id=408 bgcolor=#fefefe
| 552408 ||  || — || October 12, 2006 || Palomar || NEAT ||  || align=right data-sort-value="0.92" | 920 m || 
|-id=409 bgcolor=#d6d6d6
| 552409 ||  || — || February 22, 2003 || Klet || J. Tichá, M. Tichý ||  || align=right | 3.3 km || 
|-id=410 bgcolor=#d6d6d6
| 552410 ||  || — || January 10, 2008 || Mount Lemmon || Mount Lemmon Survey || 7:4 || align=right | 4.0 km || 
|-id=411 bgcolor=#fefefe
| 552411 ||  || — || November 2, 2000 || Kitt Peak || Spacewatch ||  || align=right data-sort-value="0.68" | 680 m || 
|-id=412 bgcolor=#d6d6d6
| 552412 ||  || — || March 16, 2004 || Kitt Peak || Spacewatch ||  || align=right | 2.7 km || 
|-id=413 bgcolor=#fefefe
| 552413 ||  || — || December 30, 2013 || Mount Lemmon || Mount Lemmon Survey ||  || align=right data-sort-value="0.68" | 680 m || 
|-id=414 bgcolor=#E9E9E9
| 552414 ||  || — || August 13, 2002 || Palomar || NEAT || EUN || align=right | 1.2 km || 
|-id=415 bgcolor=#fefefe
| 552415 ||  || — || December 4, 2013 || Haleakala || Pan-STARRS ||  || align=right | 1.1 km || 
|-id=416 bgcolor=#d6d6d6
| 552416 ||  || — || November 27, 2013 || Haleakala || Pan-STARRS ||  || align=right | 2.7 km || 
|-id=417 bgcolor=#d6d6d6
| 552417 ||  || — || June 11, 2005 || Catalina || CSS ||  || align=right | 3.3 km || 
|-id=418 bgcolor=#E9E9E9
| 552418 ||  || — || April 19, 2007 || Kitt Peak || Spacewatch ||  || align=right data-sort-value="0.86" | 860 m || 
|-id=419 bgcolor=#fefefe
| 552419 ||  || — || August 15, 2002 || Kitt Peak || Spacewatch ||  || align=right data-sort-value="0.68" | 680 m || 
|-id=420 bgcolor=#d6d6d6
| 552420 Flodubeyjames ||  ||  || December 28, 2013 || Mayhill || N. Falla ||  || align=right | 2.5 km || 
|-id=421 bgcolor=#fefefe
| 552421 ||  || — || November 17, 2009 || Mount Lemmon || Mount Lemmon Survey ||  || align=right data-sort-value="0.49" | 490 m || 
|-id=422 bgcolor=#E9E9E9
| 552422 ||  || — || December 30, 2013 || Kitt Peak || Spacewatch ||  || align=right | 1.1 km || 
|-id=423 bgcolor=#fefefe
| 552423 ||  || — || March 16, 2004 || Siding Spring || SSS ||  || align=right data-sort-value="0.86" | 860 m || 
|-id=424 bgcolor=#fefefe
| 552424 ||  || — || December 30, 2005 || Mount Lemmon || Mount Lemmon Survey ||  || align=right data-sort-value="0.89" | 890 m || 
|-id=425 bgcolor=#fefefe
| 552425 ||  || — || August 2, 2016 || Haleakala || Pan-STARRS ||  || align=right data-sort-value="0.78" | 780 m || 
|-id=426 bgcolor=#fefefe
| 552426 ||  || — || December 20, 2006 || Palomar || NEAT ||  || align=right | 1.3 km || 
|-id=427 bgcolor=#d6d6d6
| 552427 ||  || — || December 30, 2013 || Kitt Peak || Spacewatch ||  || align=right | 3.0 km || 
|-id=428 bgcolor=#fefefe
| 552428 ||  || — || November 8, 2009 || Mount Lemmon || Mount Lemmon Survey ||  || align=right data-sort-value="0.75" | 750 m || 
|-id=429 bgcolor=#d6d6d6
| 552429 ||  || — || September 17, 2006 || Kitt Peak || Spacewatch ||  || align=right | 2.9 km || 
|-id=430 bgcolor=#d6d6d6
| 552430 ||  || — || December 30, 2013 || Kitt Peak || Spacewatch ||  || align=right | 2.8 km || 
|-id=431 bgcolor=#d6d6d6
| 552431 ||  || — || December 4, 2007 || Kitt Peak || Spacewatch ||  || align=right | 2.9 km || 
|-id=432 bgcolor=#E9E9E9
| 552432 ||  || — || February 2, 2006 || Kitt Peak || Spacewatch ||  || align=right | 1.3 km || 
|-id=433 bgcolor=#fefefe
| 552433 ||  || — || February 9, 2011 || Mount Lemmon || Mount Lemmon Survey ||  || align=right data-sort-value="0.68" | 680 m || 
|-id=434 bgcolor=#fefefe
| 552434 ||  || — || May 15, 2012 || Haleakala || Pan-STARRS ||  || align=right data-sort-value="0.82" | 820 m || 
|-id=435 bgcolor=#d6d6d6
| 552435 ||  || — || February 20, 2009 || Mount Lemmon || Mount Lemmon Survey ||  || align=right | 2.7 km || 
|-id=436 bgcolor=#d6d6d6
| 552436 ||  || — || December 11, 2001 || Socorro || LINEAR ||  || align=right | 4.8 km || 
|-id=437 bgcolor=#fefefe
| 552437 ||  || — || September 26, 2006 || Kitt Peak || Spacewatch ||  || align=right data-sort-value="0.57" | 570 m || 
|-id=438 bgcolor=#d6d6d6
| 552438 ||  || — || October 11, 2007 || Kitt Peak || Spacewatch ||  || align=right | 2.9 km || 
|-id=439 bgcolor=#d6d6d6
| 552439 ||  || — || December 31, 2013 || Mount Lemmon || Mount Lemmon Survey ||  || align=right | 2.9 km || 
|-id=440 bgcolor=#E9E9E9
| 552440 ||  || — || December 31, 2013 || Mount Lemmon || Mount Lemmon Survey ||  || align=right data-sort-value="0.79" | 790 m || 
|-id=441 bgcolor=#fefefe
| 552441 ||  || — || February 23, 2011 || Kitt Peak || Spacewatch ||  || align=right data-sort-value="0.62" | 620 m || 
|-id=442 bgcolor=#fefefe
| 552442 ||  || — || June 16, 2012 || Haleakala || Pan-STARRS ||  || align=right | 1.1 km || 
|-id=443 bgcolor=#fefefe
| 552443 ||  || — || September 29, 2009 || Mount Lemmon || Mount Lemmon Survey ||  || align=right data-sort-value="0.98" | 980 m || 
|-id=444 bgcolor=#fefefe
| 552444 ||  || — || April 2, 2011 || Mount Lemmon || Mount Lemmon Survey ||  || align=right data-sort-value="0.68" | 680 m || 
|-id=445 bgcolor=#d6d6d6
| 552445 ||  || — || December 23, 2013 || Catalina || CSS || 7:4 || align=right | 3.1 km || 
|-id=446 bgcolor=#d6d6d6
| 552446 ||  || — || December 31, 2002 || Anderson Mesa || LONEOS || Tj (2.96) || align=right | 3.7 km || 
|-id=447 bgcolor=#fefefe
| 552447 ||  || — || March 29, 2011 || Mount Lemmon || Mount Lemmon Survey ||  || align=right data-sort-value="0.65" | 650 m || 
|-id=448 bgcolor=#fefefe
| 552448 ||  || — || January 8, 2011 || Mount Lemmon || Mount Lemmon Survey ||  || align=right data-sort-value="0.59" | 590 m || 
|-id=449 bgcolor=#d6d6d6
| 552449 ||  || — || February 17, 2015 || Haleakala || Pan-STARRS ||  || align=right | 3.1 km || 
|-id=450 bgcolor=#d6d6d6
| 552450 ||  || — || December 28, 2013 || Mount Lemmon || Mount Lemmon Survey ||  || align=right | 2.6 km || 
|-id=451 bgcolor=#E9E9E9
| 552451 ||  || — || January 4, 2010 || Kitt Peak || Spacewatch ||  || align=right | 1.7 km || 
|-id=452 bgcolor=#fefefe
| 552452 ||  || — || November 21, 2009 || Kitt Peak || Spacewatch ||  || align=right data-sort-value="0.65" | 650 m || 
|-id=453 bgcolor=#fefefe
| 552453 ||  || — || January 6, 2010 || Kitt Peak || Spacewatch ||  || align=right data-sort-value="0.73" | 730 m || 
|-id=454 bgcolor=#fefefe
| 552454 ||  || — || September 4, 2008 || Kitt Peak || Spacewatch ||  || align=right data-sort-value="0.67" | 670 m || 
|-id=455 bgcolor=#d6d6d6
| 552455 ||  || — || November 16, 2009 || Mount Lemmon || Mount Lemmon Survey ||  || align=right | 2.7 km || 
|-id=456 bgcolor=#fefefe
| 552456 ||  || — || January 6, 2010 || Kitt Peak || Spacewatch ||  || align=right data-sort-value="0.67" | 670 m || 
|-id=457 bgcolor=#d6d6d6
| 552457 ||  || — || January 7, 2010 || Mount Lemmon || Mount Lemmon Survey ||  || align=right | 1.9 km || 
|-id=458 bgcolor=#d6d6d6
| 552458 ||  || — || January 7, 2010 || Mount Lemmon || Mount Lemmon Survey ||  || align=right | 2.3 km || 
|-id=459 bgcolor=#E9E9E9
| 552459 ||  || — || January 4, 2010 || Kitt Peak || Spacewatch ||  || align=right | 1.1 km || 
|-id=460 bgcolor=#d6d6d6
| 552460 ||  || — || September 24, 2008 || Kitt Peak || Spacewatch ||  || align=right | 2.6 km || 
|-id=461 bgcolor=#fefefe
| 552461 ||  || — || January 6, 2010 || Kitt Peak || Spacewatch ||  || align=right data-sort-value="0.59" | 590 m || 
|-id=462 bgcolor=#fefefe
| 552462 ||  || — || January 7, 2010 || Kitt Peak || Spacewatch ||  || align=right data-sort-value="0.77" | 770 m || 
|-id=463 bgcolor=#E9E9E9
| 552463 ||  || — || January 7, 2010 || Kitt Peak || Spacewatch ||  || align=right | 2.8 km || 
|-id=464 bgcolor=#E9E9E9
| 552464 ||  || — || November 10, 2004 || Kitt Peak || Spacewatch ||  || align=right | 2.0 km || 
|-id=465 bgcolor=#fefefe
| 552465 ||  || — || January 8, 2010 || Kitt Peak || Spacewatch ||  || align=right data-sort-value="0.53" | 530 m || 
|-id=466 bgcolor=#d6d6d6
| 552466 ||  || — || September 23, 2008 || Kitt Peak || Spacewatch ||  || align=right | 2.7 km || 
|-id=467 bgcolor=#d6d6d6
| 552467 ||  || — || January 8, 2010 || Kitt Peak || Spacewatch ||  || align=right | 2.7 km || 
|-id=468 bgcolor=#d6d6d6
| 552468 ||  || — || December 26, 2009 || Kitt Peak || Spacewatch ||  || align=right | 2.0 km || 
|-id=469 bgcolor=#fefefe
| 552469 ||  || — || November 10, 2009 || Kitt Peak || Spacewatch ||  || align=right data-sort-value="0.62" | 620 m || 
|-id=470 bgcolor=#fefefe
| 552470 ||  || — || September 3, 2008 || Kitt Peak || Spacewatch ||  || align=right data-sort-value="0.81" | 810 m || 
|-id=471 bgcolor=#fefefe
| 552471 ||  || — || January 6, 2010 || Mount Lemmon || Mount Lemmon Survey ||  || align=right data-sort-value="0.76" | 760 m || 
|-id=472 bgcolor=#E9E9E9
| 552472 ||  || — || February 8, 2011 || Kitt Peak || Mount Lemmon Survey ||  || align=right | 1.7 km || 
|-id=473 bgcolor=#E9E9E9
| 552473 ||  || — || October 1, 2009 || Mount Lemmon || Mount Lemmon Survey ||  || align=right | 2.2 km || 
|-id=474 bgcolor=#C2E0FF
| 552474 ||  || — || January 8, 2010 || Haleakala || Pan-STARRS || centaurcritical || align=right | 67 km || 
|-id=475 bgcolor=#E9E9E9
| 552475 ||  || — || January 13, 2010 || Mount Lemmon || Mount Lemmon Survey ||  || align=right data-sort-value="0.79" | 790 m || 
|-id=476 bgcolor=#d6d6d6
| 552476 ||  || — || January 25, 2015 || Haleakala || Pan-STARRS ||  || align=right | 2.0 km || 
|-id=477 bgcolor=#fefefe
| 552477 ||  || — || March 28, 2014 || Mount Lemmon || Mount Lemmon Survey ||  || align=right data-sort-value="0.54" | 540 m || 
|-id=478 bgcolor=#fefefe
| 552478 ||  || — || August 21, 2015 || Haleakala || Pan-STARRS ||  || align=right data-sort-value="0.62" | 620 m || 
|-id=479 bgcolor=#fefefe
| 552479 ||  || — || January 8, 2010 || Mount Lemmon || Mount Lemmon Survey ||  || align=right data-sort-value="0.67" | 670 m || 
|-id=480 bgcolor=#E9E9E9
| 552480 ||  || — || April 22, 2011 || Kitt Peak || Spacewatch ||  || align=right | 2.1 km || 
|-id=481 bgcolor=#fefefe
| 552481 ||  || — || January 7, 2010 || Mount Lemmon || Mount Lemmon Survey ||  || align=right data-sort-value="0.52" | 520 m || 
|-id=482 bgcolor=#fefefe
| 552482 ||  || — || January 10, 2010 || Kitt Peak || Spacewatch ||  || align=right data-sort-value="0.78" | 780 m || 
|-id=483 bgcolor=#E9E9E9
| 552483 ||  || — || October 2, 2013 || Haleakala || Pan-STARRS ||  || align=right | 1.9 km || 
|-id=484 bgcolor=#d6d6d6
| 552484 ||  || — || January 11, 2010 || Kitt Peak || Spacewatch ||  || align=right | 1.7 km || 
|-id=485 bgcolor=#d6d6d6
| 552485 ||  || — || January 12, 2010 || Catalina || CSS ||  || align=right | 2.3 km || 
|-id=486 bgcolor=#d6d6d6
| 552486 ||  || — || January 15, 2015 || Haleakala || Pan-STARRS ||  || align=right | 2.1 km || 
|-id=487 bgcolor=#d6d6d6
| 552487 ||  || — || January 11, 2010 || Kitt Peak || Spacewatch ||  || align=right | 1.7 km || 
|-id=488 bgcolor=#d6d6d6
| 552488 ||  || — || September 16, 2003 || Kitt Peak || Spacewatch ||  || align=right | 2.1 km || 
|-id=489 bgcolor=#fefefe
| 552489 ||  || — || August 30, 2005 || Kitt Peak || Spacewatch ||  || align=right data-sort-value="0.67" | 670 m || 
|-id=490 bgcolor=#fefefe
| 552490 ||  || — || October 26, 2009 || Kitt Peak || Spacewatch ||  || align=right data-sort-value="0.67" | 670 m || 
|-id=491 bgcolor=#d6d6d6
| 552491 ||  || — || January 16, 2005 || Kitt Peak || Spacewatch ||  || align=right | 1.9 km || 
|-id=492 bgcolor=#fefefe
| 552492 ||  || — || February 9, 2010 || Kitt Peak || Spacewatch ||  || align=right data-sort-value="0.68" | 680 m || 
|-id=493 bgcolor=#d6d6d6
| 552493 ||  || — || February 13, 2010 || Calvin-Rehoboth || L. A. Molnar ||  || align=right | 2.5 km || 
|-id=494 bgcolor=#d6d6d6
| 552494 ||  || — || February 13, 2010 || Mount Lemmon || Mount Lemmon Survey ||  || align=right | 2.4 km || 
|-id=495 bgcolor=#FA8072
| 552495 ||  || — || December 19, 2009 || Kitt Peak || Spacewatch ||  || align=right data-sort-value="0.65" | 650 m || 
|-id=496 bgcolor=#fefefe
| 552496 ||  || — || February 13, 2010 || Mount Lemmon || Mount Lemmon Survey ||  || align=right data-sort-value="0.62" | 620 m || 
|-id=497 bgcolor=#fefefe
| 552497 ||  || — || November 21, 2005 || Catalina || CSS ||  || align=right data-sort-value="0.74" | 740 m || 
|-id=498 bgcolor=#fefefe
| 552498 ||  || — || February 13, 2010 || Mount Lemmon || Mount Lemmon Survey ||  || align=right data-sort-value="0.70" | 700 m || 
|-id=499 bgcolor=#fefefe
| 552499 ||  || — || February 13, 2010 || Mount Lemmon || Mount Lemmon Survey ||  || align=right data-sort-value="0.66" | 660 m || 
|-id=500 bgcolor=#fefefe
| 552500 ||  || — || September 5, 2008 || Kitt Peak || Spacewatch ||  || align=right data-sort-value="0.67" | 670 m || 
|}

552501–552600 

|-bgcolor=#d6d6d6
| 552501 ||  || — || January 10, 2000 || Kitt Peak || Spacewatch ||  || align=right | 2.6 km || 
|-id=502 bgcolor=#d6d6d6
| 552502 ||  || — || January 11, 2010 || Kitt Peak || Mount Lemmon Survey ||  || align=right | 2.7 km || 
|-id=503 bgcolor=#E9E9E9
| 552503 ||  || — || February 14, 2010 || Mount Lemmon || Mount Lemmon Survey ||  || align=right | 1.4 km || 
|-id=504 bgcolor=#d6d6d6
| 552504 ||  || — || February 14, 2010 || Mount Lemmon || Mount Lemmon Survey ||  || align=right | 2.2 km || 
|-id=505 bgcolor=#d6d6d6
| 552505 ||  || — || March 17, 2005 || Mount Lemmon || Mount Lemmon Survey ||  || align=right | 1.8 km || 
|-id=506 bgcolor=#d6d6d6
| 552506 ||  || — || February 14, 2010 || Mount Lemmon || Mount Lemmon Survey ||  || align=right | 2.0 km || 
|-id=507 bgcolor=#d6d6d6
| 552507 ||  || — || September 13, 2007 || Mount Lemmon || Mount Lemmon Survey ||  || align=right | 2.5 km || 
|-id=508 bgcolor=#fefefe
| 552508 ||  || — || February 14, 2010 || Mount Lemmon || Mount Lemmon Survey ||  || align=right data-sort-value="0.40" | 400 m || 
|-id=509 bgcolor=#d6d6d6
| 552509 ||  || — || February 14, 2010 || Mount Lemmon || Mount Lemmon Survey ||  || align=right | 1.9 km || 
|-id=510 bgcolor=#fefefe
| 552510 ||  || — || April 25, 2007 || Kitt Peak || Spacewatch ||  || align=right data-sort-value="0.55" | 550 m || 
|-id=511 bgcolor=#d6d6d6
| 552511 ||  || — || February 14, 2010 || Mount Lemmon || Mount Lemmon Survey ||  || align=right | 2.2 km || 
|-id=512 bgcolor=#d6d6d6
| 552512 ||  || — || February 14, 2010 || Mount Lemmon || Mount Lemmon Survey ||  || align=right | 1.9 km || 
|-id=513 bgcolor=#d6d6d6
| 552513 ||  || — || February 14, 2010 || Mount Lemmon || Mount Lemmon Survey ||  || align=right | 1.9 km || 
|-id=514 bgcolor=#d6d6d6
| 552514 ||  || — || February 14, 2010 || Mount Lemmon || Mount Lemmon Survey ||  || align=right | 2.1 km || 
|-id=515 bgcolor=#E9E9E9
| 552515 ||  || — || October 6, 2008 || Kitt Peak || Mount Lemmon Survey ||  || align=right | 2.2 km || 
|-id=516 bgcolor=#fefefe
| 552516 ||  || — || February 14, 2010 || Mount Lemmon || Mount Lemmon Survey ||  || align=right data-sort-value="0.53" | 530 m || 
|-id=517 bgcolor=#fefefe
| 552517 ||  || — || February 14, 2010 || Mount Lemmon || Mount Lemmon Survey ||  || align=right data-sort-value="0.74" | 740 m || 
|-id=518 bgcolor=#fefefe
| 552518 ||  || — || February 14, 2010 || Mount Lemmon || Mount Lemmon Survey ||  || align=right data-sort-value="0.50" | 500 m || 
|-id=519 bgcolor=#d6d6d6
| 552519 ||  || — || November 18, 2008 || Kitt Peak || Spacewatch ||  || align=right | 2.2 km || 
|-id=520 bgcolor=#d6d6d6
| 552520 ||  || — || February 15, 2010 || Mount Lemmon || Mount Lemmon Survey ||  || align=right | 1.9 km || 
|-id=521 bgcolor=#fefefe
| 552521 ||  || — || January 30, 2003 || Kitt Peak || Spacewatch ||  || align=right data-sort-value="0.53" | 530 m || 
|-id=522 bgcolor=#d6d6d6
| 552522 ||  || — || August 10, 2007 || Kitt Peak || Spacewatch ||  || align=right | 2.3 km || 
|-id=523 bgcolor=#fefefe
| 552523 ||  || — || September 6, 2008 || Kitt Peak || Spacewatch ||  || align=right data-sort-value="0.68" | 680 m || 
|-id=524 bgcolor=#d6d6d6
| 552524 ||  || — || October 24, 2003 || Mount Lemmon || SDSS ||  || align=right | 2.2 km || 
|-id=525 bgcolor=#fefefe
| 552525 ||  || — || February 13, 2010 || Kitt Peak || Spacewatch ||  || align=right data-sort-value="0.61" | 610 m || 
|-id=526 bgcolor=#fefefe
| 552526 ||  || — || February 15, 2010 || Kitt Peak || Spacewatch ||  || align=right data-sort-value="0.74" | 740 m || 
|-id=527 bgcolor=#E9E9E9
| 552527 ||  || — || December 20, 2009 || Kitt Peak || Spacewatch ||  || align=right | 2.2 km || 
|-id=528 bgcolor=#fefefe
| 552528 ||  || — || February 13, 2010 || Mount Lemmon || Mount Lemmon Survey ||  || align=right data-sort-value="0.56" | 560 m || 
|-id=529 bgcolor=#E9E9E9
| 552529 ||  || — || January 31, 2011 || Piszkesteto || Z. Kuli, K. Sárneczky ||  || align=right | 2.1 km || 
|-id=530 bgcolor=#d6d6d6
| 552530 ||  || — || December 19, 2004 || Mount Lemmon || Mount Lemmon Survey ||  || align=right | 2.8 km || 
|-id=531 bgcolor=#E9E9E9
| 552531 ||  || — || December 26, 2013 || Mount Lemmon || Mount Lemmon Survey ||  || align=right | 1.5 km || 
|-id=532 bgcolor=#fefefe
| 552532 ||  || — || February 15, 2010 || Kitt Peak || Spacewatch ||  || align=right data-sort-value="0.62" | 620 m || 
|-id=533 bgcolor=#d6d6d6
| 552533 ||  || — || January 20, 2015 || Haleakala || Pan-STARRS ||  || align=right | 2.1 km || 
|-id=534 bgcolor=#fefefe
| 552534 ||  || — || February 15, 2010 || Mount Lemmon || Mount Lemmon Survey ||  || align=right data-sort-value="0.74" | 740 m || 
|-id=535 bgcolor=#d6d6d6
| 552535 ||  || — || February 16, 2010 || Mount Lemmon || Mount Lemmon Survey ||  || align=right | 1.8 km || 
|-id=536 bgcolor=#fefefe
| 552536 ||  || — || December 18, 2009 || Mount Lemmon || Mount Lemmon Survey ||  || align=right data-sort-value="0.58" | 580 m || 
|-id=537 bgcolor=#d6d6d6
| 552537 ||  || — || February 16, 2010 || Mount Lemmon || Mount Lemmon Survey ||  || align=right | 2.0 km || 
|-id=538 bgcolor=#d6d6d6
| 552538 ||  || — || February 16, 2010 || Kitt Peak || Spacewatch ||  || align=right | 2.8 km || 
|-id=539 bgcolor=#d6d6d6
| 552539 ||  || — || February 16, 2010 || Mount Lemmon || Mount Lemmon Survey ||  || align=right | 1.9 km || 
|-id=540 bgcolor=#E9E9E9
| 552540 ||  || — || February 17, 2010 || Mount Lemmon || Mount Lemmon Survey ||  || align=right | 2.3 km || 
|-id=541 bgcolor=#d6d6d6
| 552541 ||  || — || February 9, 2010 || Kitt Peak || Spacewatch ||  || align=right | 2.4 km || 
|-id=542 bgcolor=#d6d6d6
| 552542 ||  || — || February 13, 2010 || Mount Lemmon || Mount Lemmon Survey ||  || align=right | 2.1 km || 
|-id=543 bgcolor=#d6d6d6
| 552543 ||  || — || February 20, 2009 || Kitt Peak || Spacewatch ||  || align=right | 3.1 km || 
|-id=544 bgcolor=#d6d6d6
| 552544 ||  || — || August 12, 2012 || Catalina || CSS ||  || align=right | 2.2 km || 
|-id=545 bgcolor=#fefefe
| 552545 ||  || — || July 28, 2011 || Haleakala || Pan-STARRS ||  || align=right data-sort-value="0.48" | 480 m || 
|-id=546 bgcolor=#fefefe
| 552546 ||  || — || February 17, 2010 || Kitt Peak || Spacewatch ||  || align=right data-sort-value="0.56" | 560 m || 
|-id=547 bgcolor=#fefefe
| 552547 ||  || — || February 16, 2010 || Mount Lemmon || Mount Lemmon Survey ||  || align=right data-sort-value="0.55" | 550 m || 
|-id=548 bgcolor=#d6d6d6
| 552548 ||  || — || February 16, 2010 || Kitt Peak || Spacewatch ||  || align=right | 1.7 km || 
|-id=549 bgcolor=#d6d6d6
| 552549 ||  || — || April 2, 2005 || Mount Lemmon || Mount Lemmon Survey ||  || align=right | 2.2 km || 
|-id=550 bgcolor=#fefefe
| 552550 ||  || — || February 17, 2010 || Kitt Peak || Spacewatch ||  || align=right data-sort-value="0.59" | 590 m || 
|-id=551 bgcolor=#d6d6d6
| 552551 ||  || — || November 30, 2003 || Kitt Peak || Spacewatch ||  || align=right | 2.0 km || 
|-id=552 bgcolor=#fefefe
| 552552 ||  || — || July 16, 2004 || Cerro Tololo || Cerro Tololo Obs. ||  || align=right data-sort-value="0.89" | 890 m || 
|-id=553 bgcolor=#fefefe
| 552553 ||  || — || February 15, 2010 || Kitt Peak || Spacewatch || H || align=right data-sort-value="0.52" | 520 m || 
|-id=554 bgcolor=#d6d6d6
| 552554 ||  || — || October 9, 2007 || Dauban || F. Kugel ||  || align=right | 3.2 km || 
|-id=555 bgcolor=#C2E0FF
| 552555 ||  || — || March 10, 2010 || La Silla || D. L. Rabinowitz, S. Tourtellotte || SDO || align=right | 397 km || 
|-id=556 bgcolor=#d6d6d6
| 552556 ||  || — || March 10, 2010 || Moletai || K. Černis, J. Zdanavičius ||  || align=right | 2.0 km || 
|-id=557 bgcolor=#fefefe
| 552557 ||  || — || April 26, 2003 || Kitt Peak || Spacewatch ||  || align=right data-sort-value="0.73" | 730 m || 
|-id=558 bgcolor=#d6d6d6
| 552558 ||  || — || March 12, 2010 || Mount Lemmon || Mount Lemmon Survey ||  || align=right | 2.1 km || 
|-id=559 bgcolor=#d6d6d6
| 552559 ||  || — || August 23, 2007 || Kitt Peak || Spacewatch ||  || align=right | 2.8 km || 
|-id=560 bgcolor=#fefefe
| 552560 ||  || — || March 23, 2003 || Kitt Peak || Spacewatch ||  || align=right data-sort-value="0.69" | 690 m || 
|-id=561 bgcolor=#fefefe
| 552561 ||  || — || March 12, 2010 || Mount Lemmon || Mount Lemmon Survey ||  || align=right data-sort-value="0.73" | 730 m || 
|-id=562 bgcolor=#fefefe
| 552562 ||  || — || August 23, 2007 || Kitt Peak || Spacewatch ||  || align=right data-sort-value="0.77" | 770 m || 
|-id=563 bgcolor=#d6d6d6
| 552563 ||  || — || March 14, 2010 || Mount Lemmon || Mount Lemmon Survey ||  || align=right | 2.5 km || 
|-id=564 bgcolor=#fefefe
| 552564 ||  || — || March 14, 2010 || Mount Lemmon || Mount Lemmon Survey ||  || align=right data-sort-value="0.51" | 510 m || 
|-id=565 bgcolor=#fefefe
| 552565 ||  || — || March 14, 2010 || Mount Lemmon || Mount Lemmon Survey ||  || align=right data-sort-value="0.66" | 660 m || 
|-id=566 bgcolor=#d6d6d6
| 552566 ||  || — || November 22, 2008 || Kitt Peak || Spacewatch ||  || align=right | 3.1 km || 
|-id=567 bgcolor=#d6d6d6
| 552567 ||  || — || March 8, 2005 || Mount Lemmon || Mount Lemmon Survey ||  || align=right | 2.6 km || 
|-id=568 bgcolor=#d6d6d6
| 552568 ||  || — || March 14, 2010 || Mount Lemmon || Mount Lemmon Survey ||  || align=right | 2.3 km || 
|-id=569 bgcolor=#d6d6d6
| 552569 ||  || — || February 15, 2010 || Kitt Peak || Spacewatch ||  || align=right | 1.9 km || 
|-id=570 bgcolor=#fefefe
| 552570 ||  || — || March 15, 2010 || Kitt Peak || Spacewatch ||  || align=right data-sort-value="0.69" | 690 m || 
|-id=571 bgcolor=#d6d6d6
| 552571 ||  || — || March 15, 2010 || Mount Lemmon || Mount Lemmon Survey ||  || align=right | 2.4 km || 
|-id=572 bgcolor=#fefefe
| 552572 ||  || — || March 26, 2003 || Kitt Peak || Spacewatch ||  || align=right data-sort-value="0.75" | 750 m || 
|-id=573 bgcolor=#fefefe
| 552573 ||  || — || March 14, 2010 || Mount Lemmon || Mount Lemmon Survey ||  || align=right data-sort-value="0.96" | 960 m || 
|-id=574 bgcolor=#d6d6d6
| 552574 ||  || — || March 15, 2010 || Kitt Peak || Spacewatch ||  || align=right | 2.0 km || 
|-id=575 bgcolor=#d6d6d6
| 552575 ||  || — || March 15, 2010 || Kitt Peak || Spacewatch ||  || align=right | 2.9 km || 
|-id=576 bgcolor=#d6d6d6
| 552576 ||  || — || March 13, 2010 || Kitt Peak || Spacewatch ||  || align=right | 2.7 km || 
|-id=577 bgcolor=#d6d6d6
| 552577 ||  || — || September 13, 2018 || Haleakala || Mount Lemmon Survey ||  || align=right | 1.7 km || 
|-id=578 bgcolor=#E9E9E9
| 552578 ||  || — || July 21, 2013 || Haleakala || Pan-STARRS ||  || align=right | 2.2 km || 
|-id=579 bgcolor=#d6d6d6
| 552579 ||  || — || September 20, 2006 || Kitt Peak || Spacewatch ||  || align=right | 2.2 km || 
|-id=580 bgcolor=#fefefe
| 552580 ||  || — || March 12, 2010 || Kitt Peak || Spacewatch ||  || align=right data-sort-value="0.53" | 530 m || 
|-id=581 bgcolor=#d6d6d6
| 552581 ||  || — || October 3, 2013 || Mount Lemmon || Mount Lemmon Survey ||  || align=right | 2.2 km || 
|-id=582 bgcolor=#E9E9E9
| 552582 ||  || — || April 26, 2006 || Kitt Peak || Spacewatch ||  || align=right | 1.3 km || 
|-id=583 bgcolor=#fefefe
| 552583 ||  || — || September 6, 2008 || Catalina || CSS ||  || align=right data-sort-value="0.84" | 840 m || 
|-id=584 bgcolor=#d6d6d6
| 552584 ||  || — || March 18, 2010 || Mount Lemmon || Mount Lemmon Survey ||  || align=right | 1.8 km || 
|-id=585 bgcolor=#fefefe
| 552585 ||  || — || March 26, 2003 || Kitt Peak || Spacewatch ||  || align=right data-sort-value="0.71" | 710 m || 
|-id=586 bgcolor=#d6d6d6
| 552586 ||  || — || March 18, 2010 || Mount Lemmon || Mount Lemmon Survey ||  || align=right | 2.3 km || 
|-id=587 bgcolor=#d6d6d6
| 552587 ||  || — || February 18, 2010 || Mount Lemmon || Mount Lemmon Survey ||  || align=right | 2.3 km || 
|-id=588 bgcolor=#fefefe
| 552588 ||  || — || March 18, 2010 || Mount Lemmon || Mount Lemmon Survey ||  || align=right data-sort-value="0.61" | 610 m || 
|-id=589 bgcolor=#d6d6d6
| 552589 ||  || — || March 18, 2010 || Kitt Peak || Spacewatch ||  || align=right | 2.0 km || 
|-id=590 bgcolor=#d6d6d6
| 552590 ||  || — || March 18, 2010 || Mount Lemmon || Mount Lemmon Survey ||  || align=right | 2.1 km || 
|-id=591 bgcolor=#d6d6d6
| 552591 ||  || — || March 20, 2010 || Mount Lemmon || Mount Lemmon Survey ||  || align=right | 2.5 km || 
|-id=592 bgcolor=#fefefe
| 552592 ||  || — || January 30, 2006 || Kitt Peak || Spacewatch ||  || align=right data-sort-value="0.51" | 510 m || 
|-id=593 bgcolor=#fefefe
| 552593 ||  || — || March 16, 2010 || Mount Lemmon || Mount Lemmon Survey ||  || align=right data-sort-value="0.68" | 680 m || 
|-id=594 bgcolor=#d6d6d6
| 552594 ||  || — || March 21, 2010 || Kitt Peak || Spacewatch ||  || align=right | 2.7 km || 
|-id=595 bgcolor=#fefefe
| 552595 ||  || — || September 29, 2008 || Mount Lemmon || Mount Lemmon Survey ||  || align=right data-sort-value="0.89" | 890 m || 
|-id=596 bgcolor=#d6d6d6
| 552596 ||  || — || March 23, 2010 || Mount Lemmon || Mount Lemmon Survey ||  || align=right | 3.2 km || 
|-id=597 bgcolor=#fefefe
| 552597 ||  || — || March 19, 2010 || Kitt Peak || Spacewatch ||  || align=right data-sort-value="0.84" | 840 m || 
|-id=598 bgcolor=#fefefe
| 552598 ||  || — || April 29, 2003 || Kitt Peak || Spacewatch ||  || align=right data-sort-value="0.71" | 710 m || 
|-id=599 bgcolor=#fefefe
| 552599 ||  || — || March 25, 2010 || Kitt Peak || Spacewatch ||  || align=right data-sort-value="0.78" | 780 m || 
|-id=600 bgcolor=#d6d6d6
| 552600 ||  || — || March 26, 2010 || Kitt Peak || Spacewatch ||  || align=right | 2.5 km || 
|}

552601–552700 

|-bgcolor=#fefefe
| 552601 ||  || — || August 18, 2007 || Kitt Peak || LONEOS ||  || align=right data-sort-value="0.62" | 620 m || 
|-id=602 bgcolor=#d6d6d6
| 552602 ||  || — || December 16, 2007 || Mount Lemmon || Mount Lemmon Survey ||  || align=right | 3.6 km || 
|-id=603 bgcolor=#fefefe
| 552603 ||  || — || October 9, 2012 || Mount Lemmon || Mount Lemmon Survey ||  || align=right data-sort-value="0.62" | 620 m || 
|-id=604 bgcolor=#d6d6d6
| 552604 ||  || — || August 26, 2012 || Haleakala || Pan-STARRS ||  || align=right | 2.4 km || 
|-id=605 bgcolor=#d6d6d6
| 552605 ||  || — || September 15, 2013 || Mount Lemmon || Mount Lemmon Survey ||  || align=right | 2.5 km || 
|-id=606 bgcolor=#d6d6d6
| 552606 ||  || — || September 25, 2006 || Kitt Peak || Spacewatch ||  || align=right | 1.9 km || 
|-id=607 bgcolor=#fefefe
| 552607 ||  || — || March 18, 2010 || Kitt Peak || Spacewatch ||  || align=right data-sort-value="0.57" | 570 m || 
|-id=608 bgcolor=#fefefe
| 552608 ||  || — || April 8, 2010 || Kitt Peak || Spacewatch ||  || align=right data-sort-value="0.63" | 630 m || 
|-id=609 bgcolor=#fefefe
| 552609 ||  || — || March 20, 2010 || Kitt Peak || Spacewatch || MAS || align=right data-sort-value="0.63" | 630 m || 
|-id=610 bgcolor=#d6d6d6
| 552610 ||  || — || April 4, 2010 || Kitt Peak || Spacewatch ||  || align=right | 2.0 km || 
|-id=611 bgcolor=#d6d6d6
| 552611 ||  || — || October 18, 2007 || Kitt Peak || Spacewatch ||  || align=right | 2.6 km || 
|-id=612 bgcolor=#fefefe
| 552612 ||  || — || November 19, 2008 || Mount Lemmon || Mount Lemmon Survey ||  || align=right data-sort-value="0.75" | 750 m || 
|-id=613 bgcolor=#d6d6d6
| 552613 ||  || — || October 20, 2006 || Kitt Peak || Spacewatch ||  || align=right | 2.1 km || 
|-id=614 bgcolor=#d6d6d6
| 552614 ||  || — || March 25, 2010 || Kitt Peak || Spacewatch ||  || align=right | 2.4 km || 
|-id=615 bgcolor=#d6d6d6
| 552615 ||  || — || April 10, 2010 || Kitt Peak || Spacewatch ||  || align=right | 2.8 km || 
|-id=616 bgcolor=#d6d6d6
| 552616 ||  || — || April 10, 2010 || Kitt Peak || Spacewatch ||  || align=right | 2.3 km || 
|-id=617 bgcolor=#d6d6d6
| 552617 ||  || — || October 12, 2007 || Mount Lemmon || Mount Lemmon Survey ||  || align=right | 2.3 km || 
|-id=618 bgcolor=#d6d6d6
| 552618 ||  || — || December 21, 2008 || Mount Lemmon || Mount Lemmon Survey ||  || align=right | 2.0 km || 
|-id=619 bgcolor=#d6d6d6
| 552619 ||  || — || October 14, 2007 || Mount Lemmon || Mount Lemmon Survey ||  || align=right | 2.7 km || 
|-id=620 bgcolor=#fefefe
| 552620 ||  || — || April 26, 2003 || Kitt Peak || Spacewatch ||  || align=right data-sort-value="0.61" | 610 m || 
|-id=621 bgcolor=#fefefe
| 552621 ||  || — || September 18, 2007 || Mount Lemmon || Mount Lemmon Survey ||  || align=right data-sort-value="0.71" | 710 m || 
|-id=622 bgcolor=#d6d6d6
| 552622 ||  || — || April 10, 2010 || Mount Lemmon || Mount Lemmon Survey ||  || align=right | 2.5 km || 
|-id=623 bgcolor=#fefefe
| 552623 ||  || — || January 9, 2006 || Kitt Peak || Spacewatch ||  || align=right data-sort-value="0.50" | 500 m || 
|-id=624 bgcolor=#d6d6d6
| 552624 ||  || — || October 7, 2007 || Mount Lemmon || Mount Lemmon Survey ||  || align=right | 2.7 km || 
|-id=625 bgcolor=#fefefe
| 552625 ||  || — || April 11, 2010 || Mount Lemmon || Mount Lemmon Survey ||  || align=right data-sort-value="0.53" | 530 m || 
|-id=626 bgcolor=#fefefe
| 552626 ||  || — || March 25, 2010 || Mount Lemmon || Mount Lemmon Survey ||  || align=right data-sort-value="0.70" | 700 m || 
|-id=627 bgcolor=#d6d6d6
| 552627 ||  || — || April 14, 2010 || Mount Lemmon || Mount Lemmon Survey ||  || align=right | 2.3 km || 
|-id=628 bgcolor=#fefefe
| 552628 ||  || — || August 20, 2000 || Kitt Peak || Spacewatch ||  || align=right data-sort-value="0.61" | 610 m || 
|-id=629 bgcolor=#d6d6d6
| 552629 ||  || — || April 5, 2010 || Mount Lemmon || Mount Lemmon Survey ||  || align=right | 2.3 km || 
|-id=630 bgcolor=#fefefe
| 552630 ||  || — || April 6, 2010 || Mount Lemmon || Mount Lemmon Survey ||  || align=right data-sort-value="0.57" | 570 m || 
|-id=631 bgcolor=#d6d6d6
| 552631 ||  || — || March 18, 2010 || Kitt Peak || Spacewatch ||  || align=right | 3.4 km || 
|-id=632 bgcolor=#d6d6d6
| 552632 ||  || — || April 11, 2010 || Mount Lemmon || Mount Lemmon Survey ||  || align=right | 2.2 km || 
|-id=633 bgcolor=#d6d6d6
| 552633 ||  || — || April 14, 2010 || Mount Lemmon || Mount Lemmon Survey ||  || align=right | 2.4 km || 
|-id=634 bgcolor=#d6d6d6
| 552634 ||  || — || August 25, 2000 || Cerro Tololo || R. Millis, L. H. Wasserman ||  || align=right | 2.3 km || 
|-id=635 bgcolor=#d6d6d6
| 552635 ||  || — || January 10, 2008 || Kitt Peak || Spacewatch ||  || align=right | 2.5 km || 
|-id=636 bgcolor=#E9E9E9
| 552636 ||  || — || October 28, 2008 || Kitt Peak || Spacewatch ||  || align=right | 2.7 km || 
|-id=637 bgcolor=#E9E9E9
| 552637 ||  || — || September 18, 2003 || Palomar || NEAT ||  || align=right | 2.4 km || 
|-id=638 bgcolor=#d6d6d6
| 552638 ||  || — || March 28, 2015 || Haleakala || Pan-STARRS ||  || align=right | 2.2 km || 
|-id=639 bgcolor=#fefefe
| 552639 ||  || — || October 17, 2011 || Vallemare Borbona || V. S. Casulli ||  || align=right data-sort-value="0.87" | 870 m || 
|-id=640 bgcolor=#d6d6d6
| 552640 ||  || — || August 19, 2001 || Cerro Tololo || Cerro Tololo Obs. ||  || align=right | 2.5 km || 
|-id=641 bgcolor=#d6d6d6
| 552641 ||  || — || February 16, 2015 || Haleakala || Pan-STARRS ||  || align=right | 2.4 km || 
|-id=642 bgcolor=#d6d6d6
| 552642 ||  || — || October 17, 2012 || Haleakala || Pan-STARRS ||  || align=right | 2.4 km || 
|-id=643 bgcolor=#d6d6d6
| 552643 ||  || — || August 21, 2006 || Kitt Peak || Spacewatch ||  || align=right | 1.8 km || 
|-id=644 bgcolor=#fefefe
| 552644 ||  || — || October 17, 2011 || Kitt Peak || Spacewatch || H || align=right data-sort-value="0.56" | 560 m || 
|-id=645 bgcolor=#d6d6d6
| 552645 ||  || — || August 12, 2012 || Haleakala || Pan-STARRS ||  || align=right | 2.1 km || 
|-id=646 bgcolor=#fefefe
| 552646 ||  || — || August 27, 2011 || Haleakala || Pan-STARRS ||  || align=right data-sort-value="0.79" | 790 m || 
|-id=647 bgcolor=#d6d6d6
| 552647 ||  || — || January 15, 2015 || Haleakala || Pan-STARRS ||  || align=right | 2.3 km || 
|-id=648 bgcolor=#d6d6d6
| 552648 ||  || — || April 9, 2010 || Mount Lemmon || Mount Lemmon Survey ||  || align=right | 2.6 km || 
|-id=649 bgcolor=#d6d6d6
| 552649 ||  || — || April 9, 2010 || Kitt Peak || Spacewatch ||  || align=right | 2.9 km || 
|-id=650 bgcolor=#d6d6d6
| 552650 ||  || — || October 28, 2017 || Catalina || CSS ||  || align=right | 4.0 km || 
|-id=651 bgcolor=#d6d6d6
| 552651 ||  || — || April 30, 2015 || Cerro Paranal || M. Altmann, T. Prusti ||  || align=right | 2.7 km || 
|-id=652 bgcolor=#fefefe
| 552652 ||  || — || October 3, 2005 || Kitt Peak || Spacewatch ||  || align=right data-sort-value="0.58" | 580 m || 
|-id=653 bgcolor=#d6d6d6
| 552653 ||  || — || January 28, 2015 || Haleakala || Pan-STARRS ||  || align=right | 2.4 km || 
|-id=654 bgcolor=#d6d6d6
| 552654 ||  || — || June 24, 2017 || Haleakala || Pan-STARRS ||  || align=right | 2.6 km || 
|-id=655 bgcolor=#d6d6d6
| 552655 ||  || — || May 5, 2010 || Mount Lemmon || Mount Lemmon Survey ||  || align=right | 2.4 km || 
|-id=656 bgcolor=#d6d6d6
| 552656 ||  || — || November 14, 2007 || Kitt Peak || Spacewatch ||  || align=right | 2.8 km || 
|-id=657 bgcolor=#d6d6d6
| 552657 ||  || — || May 5, 2010 || Mount Lemmon || Mount Lemmon Survey ||  || align=right | 2.2 km || 
|-id=658 bgcolor=#fefefe
| 552658 ||  || — || May 5, 2010 || Mount Lemmon || Mount Lemmon Survey ||  || align=right data-sort-value="0.57" | 570 m || 
|-id=659 bgcolor=#fefefe
| 552659 ||  || — || October 18, 2007 || Mount Lemmon || Mount Lemmon Survey ||  || align=right data-sort-value="0.71" | 710 m || 
|-id=660 bgcolor=#d6d6d6
| 552660 ||  || — || May 11, 2010 || Mount Lemmon || Mount Lemmon Survey ||  || align=right | 1.9 km || 
|-id=661 bgcolor=#fefefe
| 552661 ||  || — || April 21, 1999 || Kitt Peak || Spacewatch ||  || align=right data-sort-value="0.65" | 650 m || 
|-id=662 bgcolor=#d6d6d6
| 552662 ||  || — || May 12, 2010 || Mount Lemmon || Mount Lemmon Survey ||  || align=right | 2.7 km || 
|-id=663 bgcolor=#d6d6d6
| 552663 ||  || — || October 7, 2012 || Haleakala || Pan-STARRS ||  || align=right | 2.5 km || 
|-id=664 bgcolor=#fefefe
| 552664 ||  || — || May 5, 2010 || Mount Lemmon || Mount Lemmon Survey ||  || align=right data-sort-value="0.76" | 760 m || 
|-id=665 bgcolor=#d6d6d6
| 552665 ||  || — || April 9, 2010 || Kitt Peak || Spacewatch ||  || align=right | 2.1 km || 
|-id=666 bgcolor=#fefefe
| 552666 ||  || — || May 9, 2010 || Mount Lemmon || Mount Lemmon Survey ||  || align=right data-sort-value="0.59" | 590 m || 
|-id=667 bgcolor=#fefefe
| 552667 ||  || — || May 11, 2010 || Mount Lemmon || Mount Lemmon Survey ||  || align=right data-sort-value="0.58" | 580 m || 
|-id=668 bgcolor=#d6d6d6
| 552668 ||  || — || May 11, 2010 || Mount Lemmon || Mount Lemmon Survey ||  || align=right | 2.8 km || 
|-id=669 bgcolor=#d6d6d6
| 552669 ||  || — || August 21, 2006 || Kitt Peak || Spacewatch ||  || align=right | 2.5 km || 
|-id=670 bgcolor=#d6d6d6
| 552670 ||  || — || October 22, 2006 || Catalina || CSS ||  || align=right | 3.9 km || 
|-id=671 bgcolor=#d6d6d6
| 552671 ||  || — || May 4, 2010 || Kitt Peak || Spacewatch ||  || align=right | 3.3 km || 
|-id=672 bgcolor=#d6d6d6
| 552672 ||  || — || March 3, 2009 || Mount Lemmon || Mount Lemmon Survey ||  || align=right | 2.5 km || 
|-id=673 bgcolor=#d6d6d6
| 552673 ||  || — || November 18, 2007 || Kitt Peak || Spacewatch ||  || align=right | 2.4 km || 
|-id=674 bgcolor=#d6d6d6
| 552674 ||  || — || May 20, 2010 || Palomar || PTF || EOS || align=right | 2.4 km || 
|-id=675 bgcolor=#d6d6d6
| 552675 ||  || — || April 1, 2003 || Apache Point || SDSS Collaboration ||  || align=right | 3.2 km || 
|-id=676 bgcolor=#d6d6d6
| 552676 ||  || — || February 14, 2005 || Kitt Peak || Spacewatch ||  || align=right | 2.1 km || 
|-id=677 bgcolor=#d6d6d6
| 552677 ||  || — || January 22, 2015 || Haleakala || Pan-STARRS ||  || align=right | 2.1 km || 
|-id=678 bgcolor=#C2E0FF
| 552678 ||  || — || May 10, 2010 || Haleakala || Pan-STARRS || centaurcritical || align=right | 84 km || 
|-id=679 bgcolor=#C2E0FF
| 552679 ||  || — || May 10, 2010 || Haleakala || Pan-STARRS || plutinocritical || align=right | 161 km || 
|-id=680 bgcolor=#d6d6d6
| 552680 ||  || — || September 15, 2012 || Kitt Peak || Spacewatch ||  || align=right | 2.5 km || 
|-id=681 bgcolor=#d6d6d6
| 552681 Sósvera ||  ||  || October 21, 2012 || Piszkesteto || G. Hodosán ||  || align=right | 2.7 km || 
|-id=682 bgcolor=#d6d6d6
| 552682 ||  || — || November 7, 2012 || Haleakala || Pan-STARRS ||  || align=right | 2.2 km || 
|-id=683 bgcolor=#fefefe
| 552683 ||  || — || June 5, 2014 || Haleakala || Pan-STARRS ||  || align=right data-sort-value="0.78" | 780 m || 
|-id=684 bgcolor=#E9E9E9
| 552684 ||  || — || April 13, 2011 || Kitt Peak || Spacewatch ||  || align=right | 2.5 km || 
|-id=685 bgcolor=#d6d6d6
| 552685 ||  || — || December 11, 2013 || Haleakala || Pan-STARRS ||  || align=right | 2.3 km || 
|-id=686 bgcolor=#d6d6d6
| 552686 ||  || — || May 16, 2010 || La Sagra || OAM Obs. ||  || align=right | 2.5 km || 
|-id=687 bgcolor=#fefefe
| 552687 ||  || — || May 3, 2010 || Kitt Peak || Spacewatch ||  || align=right data-sort-value="0.75" | 750 m || 
|-id=688 bgcolor=#fefefe
| 552688 ||  || — || May 17, 2010 || Kitt Peak || Spacewatch ||  || align=right data-sort-value="0.57" | 570 m || 
|-id=689 bgcolor=#d6d6d6
| 552689 ||  || — || January 20, 2009 || Catalina || CSS ||  || align=right | 2.6 km || 
|-id=690 bgcolor=#d6d6d6
| 552690 ||  || — || January 21, 2015 || Kitt Peak || Spacewatch ||  || align=right | 2.0 km || 
|-id=691 bgcolor=#d6d6d6
| 552691 ||  || — || December 11, 2013 || Haleakala || Pan-STARRS ||  || align=right | 2.4 km || 
|-id=692 bgcolor=#fefefe
| 552692 ||  || — || June 4, 2010 || Nogales || M. Schwartz, P. R. Holvorcem ||  || align=right data-sort-value="0.79" | 790 m || 
|-id=693 bgcolor=#fefefe
| 552693 ||  || — || January 16, 2009 || Kitt Peak || Spacewatch ||  || align=right data-sort-value="0.89" | 890 m || 
|-id=694 bgcolor=#fefefe
| 552694 ||  || — || June 10, 2010 || Catalina || CSS ||  || align=right | 1.2 km || 
|-id=695 bgcolor=#d6d6d6
| 552695 ||  || — || June 6, 2010 || Kitt Peak || Spacewatch ||  || align=right | 2.5 km || 
|-id=696 bgcolor=#fefefe
| 552696 ||  || — || April 19, 2006 || Kitt Peak || Spacewatch ||  || align=right data-sort-value="0.92" | 920 m || 
|-id=697 bgcolor=#d6d6d6
| 552697 ||  || — || March 2, 2009 || Kitt Peak || Spacewatch ||  || align=right | 2.7 km || 
|-id=698 bgcolor=#d6d6d6
| 552698 ||  || — || August 10, 2010 || Kitt Peak || Spacewatch || 7:4 || align=right | 2.5 km || 
|-id=699 bgcolor=#d6d6d6
| 552699 ||  || — || May 11, 2015 || Mount Lemmon || Mount Lemmon Survey ||  || align=right | 2.2 km || 
|-id=700 bgcolor=#d6d6d6
| 552700 ||  || — || November 7, 2012 || Mount Lemmon || Mount Lemmon Survey ||  || align=right | 2.4 km || 
|}

552701–552800 

|-bgcolor=#d6d6d6
| 552701 ||  || — || September 19, 2012 || Mount Lemmon || Mount Lemmon Survey ||  || align=right | 2.9 km || 
|-id=702 bgcolor=#fefefe
| 552702 ||  || — || July 28, 2014 || Haleakala || Pan-STARRS ||  || align=right data-sort-value="0.59" | 590 m || 
|-id=703 bgcolor=#fefefe
| 552703 ||  || — || September 10, 2007 || Kitt Peak || Spacewatch ||  || align=right data-sort-value="0.82" | 820 m || 
|-id=704 bgcolor=#d6d6d6
| 552704 ||  || — || October 19, 1995 || Kitt Peak || Spacewatch ||  || align=right | 3.1 km || 
|-id=705 bgcolor=#E9E9E9
| 552705 ||  || — || July 14, 2010 || WISE || WISE ||  || align=right | 1.2 km || 
|-id=706 bgcolor=#E9E9E9
| 552706 ||  || — || July 15, 2010 || WISE || WISE ||  || align=right | 1.2 km || 
|-id=707 bgcolor=#E9E9E9
| 552707 ||  || — || October 20, 2006 || Kitt Peak || Spacewatch || KON || align=right | 1.6 km || 
|-id=708 bgcolor=#E9E9E9
| 552708 ||  || — || October 17, 2006 || Uccle || P. De Cat ||  || align=right | 1.3 km || 
|-id=709 bgcolor=#d6d6d6
| 552709 ||  || — || November 28, 2013 || Mount Lemmon || Mount Lemmon Survey ||  || align=right | 2.5 km || 
|-id=710 bgcolor=#d6d6d6
| 552710 ||  || — || August 18, 2017 || Haleakala || Pan-STARRS ||  || align=right | 2.0 km || 
|-id=711 bgcolor=#d6d6d6
| 552711 ||  || — || February 16, 2015 || Haleakala || Pan-STARRS ||  || align=right | 2.2 km || 
|-id=712 bgcolor=#d6d6d6
| 552712 ||  || — || December 11, 2012 || Mount Lemmon || Mount Lemmon Survey || 7:4 || align=right | 5.3 km || 
|-id=713 bgcolor=#fefefe
| 552713 ||  || — || June 26, 2014 || Haleakala || Pan-STARRS ||  || align=right data-sort-value="0.67" | 670 m || 
|-id=714 bgcolor=#E9E9E9
| 552714 ||  || — || December 6, 2011 || Haleakala || Pan-STARRS ||  || align=right data-sort-value="0.75" | 750 m || 
|-id=715 bgcolor=#E9E9E9
| 552715 ||  || — || July 18, 2010 || Bergisch Gladbach || W. Bickel ||  || align=right | 1.3 km || 
|-id=716 bgcolor=#d6d6d6
| 552716 ||  || — || August 27, 2006 || Kitt Peak || Spacewatch ||  || align=right | 2.3 km || 
|-id=717 bgcolor=#d6d6d6
| 552717 ||  || — || October 10, 2007 || Mount Lemmon || Mount Lemmon Survey ||  || align=right | 2.6 km || 
|-id=718 bgcolor=#fefefe
| 552718 ||  || — || June 22, 2006 || Kitt Peak || Spacewatch ||  || align=right data-sort-value="0.68" | 680 m || 
|-id=719 bgcolor=#d6d6d6
| 552719 ||  || — || September 14, 2005 || Catalina || CSS ||  || align=right | 3.9 km || 
|-id=720 bgcolor=#E9E9E9
| 552720 ||  || — || September 28, 2006 || Catalina || CSS ||  || align=right | 1.4 km || 
|-id=721 bgcolor=#d6d6d6
| 552721 ||  || — || August 13, 2010 || Kitt Peak || Spacewatch ||  || align=right | 2.5 km || 
|-id=722 bgcolor=#d6d6d6
| 552722 ||  || — || September 10, 2010 || Catalina || CSS ||  || align=right | 3.6 km || 
|-id=723 bgcolor=#fefefe
| 552723 ||  || — || August 12, 2010 || Kitt Peak || Spacewatch ||  || align=right data-sort-value="0.64" | 640 m || 
|-id=724 bgcolor=#E9E9E9
| 552724 ||  || — || August 19, 2006 || Kitt Peak || Spacewatch ||  || align=right | 1.1 km || 
|-id=725 bgcolor=#fefefe
| 552725 ||  || — || July 25, 2006 || Palomar || NEAT ||  || align=right | 1.1 km || 
|-id=726 bgcolor=#E9E9E9
| 552726 ||  || — || August 6, 2010 || Kitt Peak || Spacewatch ||  || align=right | 1.0 km || 
|-id=727 bgcolor=#E9E9E9
| 552727 ||  || — || September 2, 2010 || Piszkesteto || Z. Kuli ||  || align=right data-sort-value="0.69" | 690 m || 
|-id=728 bgcolor=#E9E9E9
| 552728 ||  || — || September 5, 2010 || La Sagra || OAM Obs. ||  || align=right data-sort-value="0.83" | 830 m || 
|-id=729 bgcolor=#E9E9E9
| 552729 ||  || — || September 5, 2010 || Mount Lemmon || Mount Lemmon Survey ||  || align=right | 1.2 km || 
|-id=730 bgcolor=#d6d6d6
| 552730 ||  || — || September 5, 2010 || Mount Lemmon || Mount Lemmon Survey ||  || align=right | 3.0 km || 
|-id=731 bgcolor=#fefefe
| 552731 ||  || — || September 5, 2010 || Mount Lemmon || Mount Lemmon Survey ||  || align=right data-sort-value="0.58" | 580 m || 
|-id=732 bgcolor=#E9E9E9
| 552732 ||  || — || September 5, 2010 || Socorro || LINEAR ||  || align=right | 1.5 km || 
|-id=733 bgcolor=#fefefe
| 552733 ||  || — || September 4, 2010 || Piszkesteto || Z. Kuli ||  || align=right data-sort-value="0.67" | 670 m || 
|-id=734 bgcolor=#E9E9E9
| 552734 ||  || — || August 21, 2006 || Kitt Peak || Spacewatch ||  || align=right data-sort-value="0.83" | 830 m || 
|-id=735 bgcolor=#E9E9E9
| 552735 ||  || — || September 6, 2010 || Kitt Peak || Spacewatch ||  || align=right | 1.3 km || 
|-id=736 bgcolor=#d6d6d6
| 552736 ||  || — || January 18, 2008 || Kitt Peak || Spacewatch ||  || align=right | 2.8 km || 
|-id=737 bgcolor=#fefefe
| 552737 ||  || — || May 30, 2006 || Mount Lemmon || Mount Lemmon Survey ||  || align=right data-sort-value="0.74" | 740 m || 
|-id=738 bgcolor=#d6d6d6
| 552738 ||  || — || August 29, 2005 || Kitt Peak || Spacewatch || BRA || align=right | 1.0 km || 
|-id=739 bgcolor=#E9E9E9
| 552739 ||  || — || September 10, 2010 || Kitt Peak || Spacewatch ||  || align=right | 1.1 km || 
|-id=740 bgcolor=#d6d6d6
| 552740 ||  || — || September 14, 2010 || Mount Lemmon || Mount Lemmon Survey || VER || align=right | 3.1 km || 
|-id=741 bgcolor=#E9E9E9
| 552741 ||  || — || September 11, 2010 || Kitt Peak || Spacewatch ||  || align=right | 1.5 km || 
|-id=742 bgcolor=#fefefe
| 552742 ||  || — || September 11, 2010 || Kitt Peak || Spacewatch ||  || align=right data-sort-value="0.58" | 580 m || 
|-id=743 bgcolor=#E9E9E9
| 552743 ||  || — || February 7, 2003 || La Silla || Astrovirtel ||  || align=right | 1.3 km || 
|-id=744 bgcolor=#E9E9E9
| 552744 ||  || — || October 18, 2006 || Kitt Peak || Spacewatch ||  || align=right data-sort-value="0.72" | 720 m || 
|-id=745 bgcolor=#fefefe
| 552745 ||  || — || August 17, 2006 || Palomar || NEAT || NYS || align=right data-sort-value="0.54" | 540 m || 
|-id=746 bgcolor=#E9E9E9
| 552746 Annanobili ||  ||  || September 11, 2010 || Andrushivka || Y. Ivaščenko ||  || align=right | 1.6 km || 
|-id=747 bgcolor=#d6d6d6
| 552747 ||  || — || September 15, 2010 || Kitt Peak || Spacewatch ||  || align=right | 2.3 km || 
|-id=748 bgcolor=#E9E9E9
| 552748 ||  || — || September 6, 2010 || Piszkesteto || Z. Kuli || MAR || align=right data-sort-value="0.73" | 730 m || 
|-id=749 bgcolor=#E9E9E9
| 552749 ||  || — || September 12, 2010 || ESA OGS || ESA OGS ||  || align=right | 1.1 km || 
|-id=750 bgcolor=#E9E9E9
| 552750 ||  || — || September 6, 2010 || Piszkesteto || Z. Kuli || MAR || align=right data-sort-value="0.78" | 780 m || 
|-id=751 bgcolor=#E9E9E9
| 552751 ||  || — || September 10, 2010 || Ka-Dar || V. Gerke ||  || align=right | 1.4 km || 
|-id=752 bgcolor=#E9E9E9
| 552752 ||  || — || September 11, 2010 || Kitt Peak || Spacewatch ||  || align=right data-sort-value="0.74" | 740 m || 
|-id=753 bgcolor=#E9E9E9
| 552753 ||  || — || September 10, 2010 || Kitt Peak || Spacewatch ||  || align=right data-sort-value="0.64" | 640 m || 
|-id=754 bgcolor=#d6d6d6
| 552754 ||  || — || January 28, 2003 || Apache Point || SDSS Collaboration ||  || align=right | 2.9 km || 
|-id=755 bgcolor=#d6d6d6
| 552755 ||  || — || June 17, 2015 || Haleakala || Pan-STARRS ||  || align=right | 2.8 km || 
|-id=756 bgcolor=#E9E9E9
| 552756 ||  || — || April 17, 2004 || Socorro || LINEAR ||  || align=right | 2.3 km || 
|-id=757 bgcolor=#d6d6d6
| 552757 ||  || — || September 11, 2010 || Mount Lemmon || Mount Lemmon Survey || 7:4 || align=right | 2.3 km || 
|-id=758 bgcolor=#E9E9E9
| 552758 ||  || — || September 5, 2010 || Mount Lemmon || Mount Lemmon Survey ||  || align=right | 1.1 km || 
|-id=759 bgcolor=#E9E9E9
| 552759 ||  || — || November 24, 2006 || Catalina || CSS ||  || align=right | 1.5 km || 
|-id=760 bgcolor=#E9E9E9
| 552760 ||  || — || October 23, 2006 || Mount Lemmon || Mount Lemmon Survey ||  || align=right data-sort-value="0.87" | 870 m || 
|-id=761 bgcolor=#E9E9E9
| 552761 ||  || — || September 17, 2010 || Mount Lemmon || Mount Lemmon Survey ||  || align=right data-sort-value="0.87" | 870 m || 
|-id=762 bgcolor=#E9E9E9
| 552762 ||  || — || September 17, 2010 || Mount Lemmon || Mount Lemmon Survey || EUN || align=right data-sort-value="0.83" | 830 m || 
|-id=763 bgcolor=#fefefe
| 552763 ||  || — || April 27, 2009 || Catalina || CSS ||  || align=right | 1.1 km || 
|-id=764 bgcolor=#E9E9E9
| 552764 ||  || — || September 30, 2006 || Mount Lemmon || Mount Lemmon Survey ||  || align=right data-sort-value="0.49" | 490 m || 
|-id=765 bgcolor=#E9E9E9
| 552765 ||  || — || November 20, 2006 || Catalina || CSS ||  || align=right | 1.7 km || 
|-id=766 bgcolor=#E9E9E9
| 552766 ||  || — || September 29, 2010 || Kitt Peak || Spacewatch ||  || align=right | 1.1 km || 
|-id=767 bgcolor=#E9E9E9
| 552767 ||  || — || September 10, 2010 || Kitt Peak || Spacewatch ||  || align=right | 1.4 km || 
|-id=768 bgcolor=#E9E9E9
| 552768 ||  || — || September 30, 2010 || Mount Lemmon || Mount Lemmon Survey ||  || align=right | 1.3 km || 
|-id=769 bgcolor=#E9E9E9
| 552769 ||  || — || September 30, 2010 || La Sagra || OAM Obs. ||  || align=right | 1.8 km || 
|-id=770 bgcolor=#d6d6d6
| 552770 ||  || — || February 11, 2018 || Haleakala || Pan-STARRS ||  || align=right | 2.1 km || 
|-id=771 bgcolor=#E9E9E9
| 552771 ||  || — || September 16, 2010 || Kitt Peak || Spacewatch ||  || align=right | 1.3 km || 
|-id=772 bgcolor=#fefefe
| 552772 ||  || — || February 3, 2017 || Haleakala || Pan-STARRS ||  || align=right data-sort-value="0.89" | 890 m || 
|-id=773 bgcolor=#E9E9E9
| 552773 ||  || — || September 18, 2010 || Mount Lemmon || Mount Lemmon Survey ||  || align=right | 1.2 km || 
|-id=774 bgcolor=#E9E9E9
| 552774 ||  || — || March 6, 2008 || Mount Lemmon || Mount Lemmon Survey ||  || align=right | 1.5 km || 
|-id=775 bgcolor=#E9E9E9
| 552775 ||  || — || October 2, 2010 || Kitt Peak || Spacewatch ||  || align=right | 2.3 km || 
|-id=776 bgcolor=#E9E9E9
| 552776 ||  || — || November 22, 2006 || Catalina || CSS ||  || align=right | 1.4 km || 
|-id=777 bgcolor=#E9E9E9
| 552777 ||  || — || September 16, 2010 || Kitt Peak || Spacewatch || EUN || align=right data-sort-value="0.93" | 930 m || 
|-id=778 bgcolor=#fefefe
| 552778 ||  || — || March 3, 2009 || Kitt Peak || Spacewatch ||  || align=right data-sort-value="0.60" | 600 m || 
|-id=779 bgcolor=#E9E9E9
| 552779 ||  || — || September 17, 2010 || Catalina || CSS ||  || align=right | 1.5 km || 
|-id=780 bgcolor=#E9E9E9
| 552780 ||  || — || October 21, 2006 || Kitt Peak || Spacewatch ||  || align=right | 1.0 km || 
|-id=781 bgcolor=#E9E9E9
| 552781 ||  || — || October 3, 2010 || Kitt Peak || Spacewatch ||  || align=right data-sort-value="0.93" | 930 m || 
|-id=782 bgcolor=#E9E9E9
| 552782 ||  || — || January 18, 2004 || Catalina || CSS ||  || align=right | 1.4 km || 
|-id=783 bgcolor=#E9E9E9
| 552783 ||  || — || October 1, 2010 || Catalina || CSS ||  || align=right | 1.5 km || 
|-id=784 bgcolor=#d6d6d6
| 552784 ||  || — || October 6, 2010 || Vicques || M. Ory ||  || align=right | 2.7 km || 
|-id=785 bgcolor=#E9E9E9
| 552785 ||  || — || September 10, 2010 || Kitt Peak || Spacewatch ||  || align=right data-sort-value="0.85" | 850 m || 
|-id=786 bgcolor=#E9E9E9
| 552786 ||  || — || November 1, 2006 || Kitt Peak || Spacewatch ||  || align=right | 1.2 km || 
|-id=787 bgcolor=#E9E9E9
| 552787 ||  || — || September 27, 2006 || Mount Lemmon || Mount Lemmon Survey ||  || align=right | 1.1 km || 
|-id=788 bgcolor=#E9E9E9
| 552788 ||  || — || September 17, 2010 || Mount Lemmon || Mount Lemmon Survey ||  || align=right | 1.4 km || 
|-id=789 bgcolor=#E9E9E9
| 552789 ||  || — || October 2, 2006 || Kitt Peak || Spacewatch ||  || align=right data-sort-value="0.91" | 910 m || 
|-id=790 bgcolor=#E9E9E9
| 552790 ||  || — || September 4, 2010 || Kitt Peak || Spacewatch ||  || align=right | 1.3 km || 
|-id=791 bgcolor=#E9E9E9
| 552791 ||  || — || September 4, 2010 || Kitt Peak || Spacewatch ||  || align=right | 1.2 km || 
|-id=792 bgcolor=#d6d6d6
| 552792 ||  || — || November 4, 2005 || Mount Lemmon || Mount Lemmon Survey ||  || align=right | 2.5 km || 
|-id=793 bgcolor=#d6d6d6
| 552793 ||  || — || September 18, 2010 || Kitt Peak || Spacewatch ||  || align=right | 1.3 km || 
|-id=794 bgcolor=#E9E9E9
| 552794 ||  || — || December 7, 2006 || Palomar || NEAT ||  || align=right | 1.2 km || 
|-id=795 bgcolor=#E9E9E9
| 552795 ||  || — || October 8, 2010 || Kitt Peak || Spacewatch ||  || align=right | 1.2 km || 
|-id=796 bgcolor=#E9E9E9
| 552796 ||  || — || September 19, 2006 || Kitt Peak || Spacewatch ||  || align=right data-sort-value="0.68" | 680 m || 
|-id=797 bgcolor=#E9E9E9
| 552797 ||  || — || September 30, 2010 || Mount Lemmon || Mount Lemmon Survey ||  || align=right data-sort-value="0.79" | 790 m || 
|-id=798 bgcolor=#E9E9E9
| 552798 ||  || — || October 9, 2010 || Mount Lemmon || Mount Lemmon Survey ||  || align=right data-sort-value="0.94" | 940 m || 
|-id=799 bgcolor=#E9E9E9
| 552799 ||  || — || October 9, 2010 || Mount Lemmon || Mount Lemmon Survey ||  || align=right | 1.0 km || 
|-id=800 bgcolor=#E9E9E9
| 552800 ||  || — || October 20, 2006 || Kitt Peak || Spacewatch ||  || align=right | 1.5 km || 
|}

552801–552900 

|-bgcolor=#E9E9E9
| 552801 ||  || — || October 2, 2010 || Kitt Peak || Spacewatch ||  || align=right | 1.3 km || 
|-id=802 bgcolor=#E9E9E9
| 552802 ||  || — || October 17, 2001 || Kitt Peak || Spacewatch ||  || align=right | 1.6 km || 
|-id=803 bgcolor=#E9E9E9
| 552803 ||  || — || September 17, 2010 || Mount Lemmon || Mount Lemmon Survey ||  || align=right | 1.1 km || 
|-id=804 bgcolor=#E9E9E9
| 552804 ||  || — || March 2, 2008 || Kitt Peak || Spacewatch ||  || align=right | 1.1 km || 
|-id=805 bgcolor=#E9E9E9
| 552805 ||  || — || September 30, 2010 || Catalina || CSS || (1547) || align=right | 1.4 km || 
|-id=806 bgcolor=#E9E9E9
| 552806 ||  || — || December 27, 2006 || Mount Lemmon || Mount Lemmon Survey ||  || align=right | 1.0 km || 
|-id=807 bgcolor=#E9E9E9
| 552807 ||  || — || October 11, 2010 || Bergisch Gladbach || W. Bickel ||  || align=right | 1.6 km || 
|-id=808 bgcolor=#E9E9E9
| 552808 ||  || — || October 11, 2010 || Mount Lemmon || Mount Lemmon Survey ||  || align=right data-sort-value="0.60" | 600 m || 
|-id=809 bgcolor=#E9E9E9
| 552809 ||  || — || May 14, 2005 || Kitt Peak || Spacewatch ||  || align=right data-sort-value="0.87" | 870 m || 
|-id=810 bgcolor=#E9E9E9
| 552810 ||  || — || October 11, 2010 || Mount Lemmon || Mount Lemmon Survey ||  || align=right | 1.3 km || 
|-id=811 bgcolor=#E9E9E9
| 552811 ||  || — || October 11, 2010 || Mount Lemmon || Mount Lemmon Survey ||  || align=right | 1.1 km || 
|-id=812 bgcolor=#E9E9E9
| 552812 ||  || — || October 11, 2010 || Mount Lemmon || Mount Lemmon Survey ||  || align=right | 1.5 km || 
|-id=813 bgcolor=#E9E9E9
| 552813 ||  || — || August 3, 2001 || Palomar || NEAT ||  || align=right | 2.3 km || 
|-id=814 bgcolor=#E9E9E9
| 552814 ||  || — || September 18, 2010 || Mount Lemmon || Mount Lemmon Survey ||  || align=right | 1.1 km || 
|-id=815 bgcolor=#E9E9E9
| 552815 ||  || — || October 10, 2010 || Mount Lemmon || Mount Lemmon Survey ||  || align=right | 1.0 km || 
|-id=816 bgcolor=#E9E9E9
| 552816 ||  || — || September 27, 2006 || Kitt Peak || Spacewatch ||  || align=right data-sort-value="0.68" | 680 m || 
|-id=817 bgcolor=#E9E9E9
| 552817 ||  || — || October 23, 2006 || Kitt Peak || Spacewatch ||  || align=right | 1.1 km || 
|-id=818 bgcolor=#d6d6d6
| 552818 ||  || — || November 4, 2010 || Mount Lemmon || Mount Lemmon Survey ||  || align=right | 4.2 km || 
|-id=819 bgcolor=#fefefe
| 552819 ||  || — || August 15, 2006 || Palomar || NEAT ||  || align=right | 1.0 km || 
|-id=820 bgcolor=#E9E9E9
| 552820 ||  || — || January 19, 2012 || Kitt Peak || Spacewatch ||  || align=right | 1.3 km || 
|-id=821 bgcolor=#E9E9E9
| 552821 ||  || — || December 9, 2010 || Catalina || CSS ||  || align=right | 1.1 km || 
|-id=822 bgcolor=#E9E9E9
| 552822 ||  || — || October 29, 2010 || Mount Lemmon || Mount Lemmon Survey ||  || align=right data-sort-value="0.79" | 790 m || 
|-id=823 bgcolor=#E9E9E9
| 552823 ||  || — || October 9, 2010 || Catalina || CSS ||  || align=right | 1.3 km || 
|-id=824 bgcolor=#E9E9E9
| 552824 ||  || — || October 3, 2010 || Kitt Peak || Spacewatch ||  || align=right | 1.7 km || 
|-id=825 bgcolor=#E9E9E9
| 552825 ||  || — || October 14, 2010 || Mount Lemmon || Mount Lemmon Survey ||  || align=right | 1.1 km || 
|-id=826 bgcolor=#E9E9E9
| 552826 ||  || — || July 29, 2014 || Haleakala || Pan-STARRS ||  || align=right | 1.2 km || 
|-id=827 bgcolor=#fefefe
| 552827 ||  || — || May 16, 2013 || Mount Lemmon || Mount Lemmon Survey ||  || align=right data-sort-value="0.61" | 610 m || 
|-id=828 bgcolor=#E9E9E9
| 552828 ||  || — || October 10, 2010 || Kitt Peak || Spacewatch ||  || align=right | 1.1 km || 
|-id=829 bgcolor=#E9E9E9
| 552829 ||  || — || October 3, 2010 || Kitt Peak || Spacewatch ||  || align=right | 1.1 km || 
|-id=830 bgcolor=#E9E9E9
| 552830 ||  || — || October 3, 2010 || Kitt Peak || Spacewatch ||  || align=right | 1.4 km || 
|-id=831 bgcolor=#E9E9E9
| 552831 ||  || — || April 12, 2013 || Haleakala || Pan-STARRS ||  || align=right data-sort-value="0.89" | 890 m || 
|-id=832 bgcolor=#E9E9E9
| 552832 ||  || — || October 13, 2010 || Mount Lemmon || Mount Lemmon Survey ||  || align=right data-sort-value="0.82" | 820 m || 
|-id=833 bgcolor=#d6d6d6
| 552833 ||  || — || September 30, 2010 || Mount Lemmon || Mount Lemmon Survey || 7:4 || align=right | 3.1 km || 
|-id=834 bgcolor=#E9E9E9
| 552834 ||  || — || October 14, 2010 || Mount Lemmon || Mount Lemmon Survey ||  || align=right | 1.4 km || 
|-id=835 bgcolor=#fefefe
| 552835 ||  || — || October 12, 2010 || Mount Lemmon || Mount Lemmon Survey ||  || align=right data-sort-value="0.63" | 630 m || 
|-id=836 bgcolor=#E9E9E9
| 552836 ||  || — || October 14, 2010 || Catalina || CSS ||  || align=right | 1.3 km || 
|-id=837 bgcolor=#d6d6d6
| 552837 ||  || — || October 2, 2010 || Mount Lemmon || Mount Lemmon Survey ||  || align=right | 1.8 km || 
|-id=838 bgcolor=#d6d6d6
| 552838 ||  || — || October 11, 2010 || Mount Lemmon || Mount Lemmon Survey || 7:4 || align=right | 2.7 km || 
|-id=839 bgcolor=#E9E9E9
| 552839 ||  || — || October 17, 2010 || Mount Lemmon || Mount Lemmon Survey ||  || align=right data-sort-value="0.75" | 750 m || 
|-id=840 bgcolor=#E9E9E9
| 552840 ||  || — || October 31, 2006 || Mount Lemmon || Mount Lemmon Survey ||  || align=right data-sort-value="0.90" | 900 m || 
|-id=841 bgcolor=#E9E9E9
| 552841 ||  || — || October 17, 2010 || Mount Lemmon || Mount Lemmon Survey ||  || align=right | 1.2 km || 
|-id=842 bgcolor=#E9E9E9
| 552842 ||  || — || November 13, 2006 || Catalina || CSS ||  || align=right | 1.8 km || 
|-id=843 bgcolor=#E9E9E9
| 552843 ||  || — || October 28, 2010 || Palomar || Spacewatch || ADE || align=right | 2.6 km || 
|-id=844 bgcolor=#E9E9E9
| 552844 ||  || — || October 1, 2010 || Mount Lemmon || Mount Lemmon Survey ||  || align=right | 1.3 km || 
|-id=845 bgcolor=#E9E9E9
| 552845 ||  || — || October 11, 2010 || Saint-Sulpice || B. Christophe ||  || align=right | 1.8 km || 
|-id=846 bgcolor=#d6d6d6
| 552846 ||  || — || September 30, 2005 || Mount Lemmon || Mount Lemmon Survey ||  || align=right | 1.7 km || 
|-id=847 bgcolor=#E9E9E9
| 552847 ||  || — || October 28, 2010 || Piszkesteto || Z. Kuli, K. Sárneczky ||  || align=right | 1.3 km || 
|-id=848 bgcolor=#d6d6d6
| 552848 ||  || — || October 11, 2010 || Mount Lemmon || Mount Lemmon Survey ||  || align=right | 2.0 km || 
|-id=849 bgcolor=#E9E9E9
| 552849 ||  || — || September 28, 2006 || Mount Lemmon || Mount Lemmon Survey ||  || align=right | 1.3 km || 
|-id=850 bgcolor=#E9E9E9
| 552850 ||  || — || October 13, 2010 || Mount Lemmon || Mount Lemmon Survey ||  || align=right | 1.2 km || 
|-id=851 bgcolor=#E9E9E9
| 552851 ||  || — || October 31, 2010 || Mount Lemmon || Mount Lemmon Survey ||  || align=right data-sort-value="0.87" | 870 m || 
|-id=852 bgcolor=#E9E9E9
| 552852 ||  || — || September 17, 2010 || Mount Lemmon || Mount Lemmon Survey ||  || align=right | 1.1 km || 
|-id=853 bgcolor=#E9E9E9
| 552853 ||  || — || October 29, 2010 || Kitt Peak || Spacewatch ||  || align=right | 1.3 km || 
|-id=854 bgcolor=#E9E9E9
| 552854 ||  || — || October 4, 2006 || Mount Lemmon || Mount Lemmon Survey ||  || align=right data-sort-value="0.98" | 980 m || 
|-id=855 bgcolor=#E9E9E9
| 552855 ||  || — || October 31, 2010 || Piszkesteto || Z. Kuli, K. Sárneczky ||  || align=right data-sort-value="0.83" | 830 m || 
|-id=856 bgcolor=#E9E9E9
| 552856 ||  || — || October 31, 2010 || Kitt Peak || Spacewatch ||  || align=right | 1.8 km || 
|-id=857 bgcolor=#E9E9E9
| 552857 ||  || — || August 14, 2001 || Haleakala || AMOS ||  || align=right | 1.9 km || 
|-id=858 bgcolor=#E9E9E9
| 552858 ||  || — || September 2, 2005 || Palomar || NEAT ||  || align=right | 3.2 km || 
|-id=859 bgcolor=#E9E9E9
| 552859 ||  || — || July 21, 2001 || Palomar || NEAT ||  || align=right | 2.0 km || 
|-id=860 bgcolor=#E9E9E9
| 552860 ||  || — || November 3, 2010 || Mount Lemmon || Mount Lemmon Survey ||  || align=right data-sort-value="0.83" | 830 m || 
|-id=861 bgcolor=#E9E9E9
| 552861 ||  || — || October 11, 2010 || Mount Lemmon || Mount Lemmon Survey ||  || align=right | 1.2 km || 
|-id=862 bgcolor=#E9E9E9
| 552862 ||  || — || October 17, 2010 || Mount Lemmon || Mount Lemmon Survey ||  || align=right | 1.2 km || 
|-id=863 bgcolor=#E9E9E9
| 552863 ||  || — || October 17, 2010 || Mount Lemmon || Mount Lemmon Survey ||  || align=right | 1.3 km || 
|-id=864 bgcolor=#E9E9E9
| 552864 ||  || — || February 9, 2007 || Kitt Peak || Spacewatch ||  || align=right | 1.4 km || 
|-id=865 bgcolor=#d6d6d6
| 552865 ||  || — || March 15, 2013 || Mount Lemmon || Mount Lemmon Survey ||  || align=right | 2.1 km || 
|-id=866 bgcolor=#E9E9E9
| 552866 ||  || — || April 14, 2008 || Kitt Peak || Spacewatch ||  || align=right | 1.4 km || 
|-id=867 bgcolor=#fefefe
| 552867 ||  || — || October 31, 2010 || Mount Lemmon || Mount Lemmon Survey ||  || align=right data-sort-value="0.52" | 520 m || 
|-id=868 bgcolor=#d6d6d6
| 552868 ||  || — || October 17, 2010 || Mount Lemmon || Mount Lemmon Survey ||  || align=right | 2.0 km || 
|-id=869 bgcolor=#E9E9E9
| 552869 ||  || — || October 11, 2010 || Mount Lemmon || Mount Lemmon Survey ||  || align=right data-sort-value="0.82" | 820 m || 
|-id=870 bgcolor=#E9E9E9
| 552870 ||  || — || October 19, 2006 || Mount Lemmon || Mount Lemmon Survey ||  || align=right data-sort-value="0.85" | 850 m || 
|-id=871 bgcolor=#E9E9E9
| 552871 ||  || — || November 1, 2010 || Kitt Peak || Spacewatch ||  || align=right data-sort-value="0.69" | 690 m || 
|-id=872 bgcolor=#E9E9E9
| 552872 ||  || — || September 4, 2010 || Kitt Peak || Spacewatch ||  || align=right | 1.6 km || 
|-id=873 bgcolor=#E9E9E9
| 552873 ||  || — || November 19, 2006 || Catalina || CSS ||  || align=right | 1.3 km || 
|-id=874 bgcolor=#fefefe
| 552874 ||  || — || November 6, 2010 || Catalina || CSS || H || align=right data-sort-value="0.76" | 760 m || 
|-id=875 bgcolor=#E9E9E9
| 552875 ||  || — || January 10, 2007 || Mount Lemmon || Mount Lemmon Survey ||  || align=right | 1.5 km || 
|-id=876 bgcolor=#E9E9E9
| 552876 ||  || — || February 6, 2008 || Kitt Peak || Spacewatch ||  || align=right data-sort-value="0.84" | 840 m || 
|-id=877 bgcolor=#E9E9E9
| 552877 ||  || — || November 3, 2010 || Mount Lemmon || Mount Lemmon Survey ||  || align=right | 1.1 km || 
|-id=878 bgcolor=#E9E9E9
| 552878 ||  || — || September 29, 2005 || Catalina || CSS ||  || align=right | 2.5 km || 
|-id=879 bgcolor=#E9E9E9
| 552879 ||  || — || November 2, 2010 || Kitt Peak || Spacewatch ||  || align=right | 1.2 km || 
|-id=880 bgcolor=#E9E9E9
| 552880 ||  || — || November 1, 2010 || Mount Lemmon || Mount Lemmon Survey ||  || align=right | 1.1 km || 
|-id=881 bgcolor=#E9E9E9
| 552881 ||  || — || November 2, 2010 || Mount Lemmon || Mount Lemmon Survey ||  || align=right data-sort-value="0.69" | 690 m || 
|-id=882 bgcolor=#fefefe
| 552882 ||  || — || November 5, 2010 || Kitt Peak || Spacewatch ||  || align=right data-sort-value="0.77" | 770 m || 
|-id=883 bgcolor=#E9E9E9
| 552883 ||  || — || November 23, 2006 || Kitt Peak || Spacewatch ||  || align=right | 1.3 km || 
|-id=884 bgcolor=#E9E9E9
| 552884 ||  || — || November 2, 2010 || Mount Lemmon || Mount Lemmon Survey ||  || align=right data-sort-value="0.83" | 830 m || 
|-id=885 bgcolor=#E9E9E9
| 552885 ||  || — || November 17, 2006 || Mount Lemmon || Mount Lemmon Survey ||  || align=right | 1.3 km || 
|-id=886 bgcolor=#E9E9E9
| 552886 ||  || — || November 3, 2010 || Kitt Peak || Spacewatch ||  || align=right | 1.2 km || 
|-id=887 bgcolor=#fefefe
| 552887 ||  || — || November 3, 2010 || Mount Lemmon || Mount Lemmon Survey ||  || align=right data-sort-value="0.60" | 600 m || 
|-id=888 bgcolor=#E9E9E9
| 552888 Felixrodriguez ||  ||  || November 5, 2010 || Pla D'Arguines || R. Ferrando, M. Ferrando ||  || align=right | 1.5 km || 
|-id=889 bgcolor=#E9E9E9
| 552889 ||  || — || April 7, 2008 || Kitt Peak || Spacewatch ||  || align=right | 1.2 km || 
|-id=890 bgcolor=#E9E9E9
| 552890 ||  || — || November 6, 2010 || Kitt Peak || Spacewatch ||  || align=right data-sort-value="0.94" | 940 m || 
|-id=891 bgcolor=#E9E9E9
| 552891 ||  || — || November 8, 2010 || Kitt Peak || Spacewatch ||  || align=right | 1.6 km || 
|-id=892 bgcolor=#E9E9E9
| 552892 ||  || — || October 30, 2010 || Piszkesteto || Z. Kuli, K. Sárneczky ||  || align=right | 1.6 km || 
|-id=893 bgcolor=#E9E9E9
| 552893 ||  || — || February 6, 2007 || Palomar || NEAT ||  || align=right | 1.9 km || 
|-id=894 bgcolor=#E9E9E9
| 552894 ||  || — || September 16, 2010 || Mount Lemmon || Mount Lemmon Survey || EUN || align=right data-sort-value="0.89" | 890 m || 
|-id=895 bgcolor=#E9E9E9
| 552895 ||  || — || September 11, 2010 || Mount Lemmon || Mount Lemmon Survey ||  || align=right data-sort-value="0.94" | 940 m || 
|-id=896 bgcolor=#E9E9E9
| 552896 ||  || — || September 11, 2010 || Mount Lemmon || Mount Lemmon Survey ||  || align=right | 1.2 km || 
|-id=897 bgcolor=#E9E9E9
| 552897 ||  || — || November 24, 2006 || Nyukasa || H. Kurosaki, A. Nakajima ||  || align=right | 1.2 km || 
|-id=898 bgcolor=#E9E9E9
| 552898 ||  || — || November 8, 2010 || Mount Lemmon || Mount Lemmon Survey ||  || align=right data-sort-value="0.88" | 880 m || 
|-id=899 bgcolor=#E9E9E9
| 552899 ||  || — || November 1, 2010 || Kitt Peak || Spacewatch ||  || align=right | 1.4 km || 
|-id=900 bgcolor=#E9E9E9
| 552900 ||  || — || November 1, 2010 || Kitt Peak || Spacewatch ||  || align=right data-sort-value="0.90" | 900 m || 
|}

552901–553000 

|-bgcolor=#E9E9E9
| 552901 ||  || — || September 11, 2010 || Mount Lemmon || Mount Lemmon Survey ||  || align=right data-sort-value="0.81" | 810 m || 
|-id=902 bgcolor=#d6d6d6
| 552902 ||  || — || November 1, 2010 || Kitt Peak || Spacewatch ||  || align=right | 2.4 km || 
|-id=903 bgcolor=#E9E9E9
| 552903 ||  || — || November 7, 2010 || Mount Lemmon || Mount Lemmon Survey ||  || align=right | 1.1 km || 
|-id=904 bgcolor=#E9E9E9
| 552904 ||  || — || February 17, 2007 || Mount Lemmon || Mount Lemmon Survey ||  || align=right | 1.4 km || 
|-id=905 bgcolor=#E9E9E9
| 552905 ||  || — || November 6, 2010 || Mount Lemmon || Mount Lemmon Survey ||  || align=right data-sort-value="0.92" | 920 m || 
|-id=906 bgcolor=#E9E9E9
| 552906 ||  || — || November 6, 2010 || Mount Lemmon || Mount Lemmon Survey ||  || align=right | 1.5 km || 
|-id=907 bgcolor=#E9E9E9
| 552907 ||  || — || November 11, 2002 || Socorro || LINEAR ||  || align=right data-sort-value="0.84" | 840 m || 
|-id=908 bgcolor=#E9E9E9
| 552908 ||  || — || November 6, 2010 || Mount Lemmon || Mount Lemmon Survey ||  || align=right | 1.6 km || 
|-id=909 bgcolor=#E9E9E9
| 552909 ||  || — || November 6, 2010 || Mount Lemmon || Mount Lemmon Survey ||  || align=right | 1.2 km || 
|-id=910 bgcolor=#E9E9E9
| 552910 ||  || — || November 6, 2010 || Mount Lemmon || Mount Lemmon Survey ||  || align=right | 1.4 km || 
|-id=911 bgcolor=#E9E9E9
| 552911 ||  || — || November 10, 2010 || Mount Lemmon || Mount Lemmon Survey ||  || align=right data-sort-value="0.73" | 730 m || 
|-id=912 bgcolor=#E9E9E9
| 552912 ||  || — || October 19, 2010 || Mount Lemmon || Mount Lemmon Survey ||  || align=right | 1.2 km || 
|-id=913 bgcolor=#E9E9E9
| 552913 ||  || — || November 1, 2010 || Kitt Peak || Spacewatch ||  || align=right | 1.1 km || 
|-id=914 bgcolor=#E9E9E9
| 552914 ||  || — || November 11, 2010 || Catalina || CSS ||  || align=right | 1.7 km || 
|-id=915 bgcolor=#E9E9E9
| 552915 ||  || — || November 10, 2010 || Catalina || CSS ||  || align=right data-sort-value="0.72" | 720 m || 
|-id=916 bgcolor=#E9E9E9
| 552916 ||  || — || May 29, 2009 || Mount Lemmon || Mount Lemmon Survey ||  || align=right | 1.3 km || 
|-id=917 bgcolor=#E9E9E9
| 552917 ||  || — || November 1, 2010 || Marly || P. Kocher ||  || align=right data-sort-value="0.98" | 980 m || 
|-id=918 bgcolor=#E9E9E9
| 552918 ||  || — || November 27, 2006 || Kitt Peak || Spacewatch ||  || align=right | 1.1 km || 
|-id=919 bgcolor=#fefefe
| 552919 ||  || — || November 8, 2010 || Catalina || CSS ||  || align=right | 1.4 km || 
|-id=920 bgcolor=#E9E9E9
| 552920 ||  || — || October 31, 2010 || Catalina || CSS ||  || align=right | 1.9 km || 
|-id=921 bgcolor=#E9E9E9
| 552921 ||  || — || October 29, 2010 || Mount Lemmon || Mount Lemmon Survey || NEM || align=right | 1.9 km || 
|-id=922 bgcolor=#E9E9E9
| 552922 ||  || — || October 17, 2006 || Catalina || CSS ||  || align=right | 1.9 km || 
|-id=923 bgcolor=#E9E9E9
| 552923 ||  || — || November 6, 2010 || Mount Lemmon || Mount Lemmon Survey ||  || align=right | 1.7 km || 
|-id=924 bgcolor=#E9E9E9
| 552924 ||  || — || December 21, 2006 || Kitt Peak || Spacewatch ||  || align=right | 2.2 km || 
|-id=925 bgcolor=#E9E9E9
| 552925 ||  || — || November 15, 2006 || Kitt Peak || Spacewatch ||  || align=right data-sort-value="0.71" | 710 m || 
|-id=926 bgcolor=#E9E9E9
| 552926 ||  || — || September 17, 2010 || Mount Lemmon || Mount Lemmon Survey ||  || align=right | 1.1 km || 
|-id=927 bgcolor=#E9E9E9
| 552927 ||  || — || November 13, 2010 || Mount Lemmon || PTF ||  || align=right | 1.2 km || 
|-id=928 bgcolor=#E9E9E9
| 552928 ||  || — || November 5, 2010 || Mount Lemmon || Mount Lemmon Survey ||  || align=right | 1.7 km || 
|-id=929 bgcolor=#E9E9E9
| 552929 ||  || — || November 3, 2010 || Mount Lemmon || Mount Lemmon Survey ||  || align=right | 1.9 km || 
|-id=930 bgcolor=#E9E9E9
| 552930 ||  || — || November 12, 2010 || Mount Lemmon || Mount Lemmon Survey ||  || align=right | 1.4 km || 
|-id=931 bgcolor=#fefefe
| 552931 ||  || — || September 13, 2014 || Haleakala || Pan-STARRS ||  || align=right data-sort-value="0.74" | 740 m || 
|-id=932 bgcolor=#E9E9E9
| 552932 ||  || — || November 3, 2010 || Mount Lemmon || Mount Lemmon Survey ||  || align=right | 1.4 km || 
|-id=933 bgcolor=#E9E9E9
| 552933 ||  || — || April 7, 2013 || Kitt Peak || Spacewatch ||  || align=right data-sort-value="0.84" | 840 m || 
|-id=934 bgcolor=#E9E9E9
| 552934 ||  || — || November 3, 2010 || Mount Lemmon || Mount Lemmon Survey ||  || align=right | 1.2 km || 
|-id=935 bgcolor=#fefefe
| 552935 ||  || — || November 3, 2010 || Mount Lemmon || Mount Lemmon Survey ||  || align=right data-sort-value="0.68" | 680 m || 
|-id=936 bgcolor=#E9E9E9
| 552936 ||  || — || April 17, 2013 || Haleakala || Pan-STARRS ||  || align=right | 1.6 km || 
|-id=937 bgcolor=#E9E9E9
| 552937 ||  || — || April 26, 2003 || Kitt Peak || Spacewatch ||  || align=right | 1.7 km || 
|-id=938 bgcolor=#E9E9E9
| 552938 ||  || — || November 1, 2010 || Mount Lemmon || Mount Lemmon Survey ||  || align=right | 3.3 km || 
|-id=939 bgcolor=#E9E9E9
| 552939 ||  || — || November 13, 2010 || Mount Lemmon || Mount Lemmon Survey ||  || align=right | 1.7 km || 
|-id=940 bgcolor=#E9E9E9
| 552940 ||  || — || November 10, 2010 || Mount Lemmon || Mount Lemmon Survey ||  || align=right data-sort-value="0.96" | 960 m || 
|-id=941 bgcolor=#E9E9E9
| 552941 ||  || — || November 5, 2010 || Kitt Peak || Spacewatch ||  || align=right | 1.1 km || 
|-id=942 bgcolor=#d6d6d6
| 552942 ||  || — || November 8, 2010 || Mount Lemmon || Mount Lemmon Survey || 7:4 || align=right | 3.6 km || 
|-id=943 bgcolor=#E9E9E9
| 552943 ||  || — || November 5, 2010 || Kitt Peak || Spacewatch ||  || align=right data-sort-value="0.93" | 930 m || 
|-id=944 bgcolor=#d6d6d6
| 552944 ||  || — || November 11, 2010 || Mount Lemmon || Mount Lemmon Survey ||  || align=right | 2.2 km || 
|-id=945 bgcolor=#E9E9E9
| 552945 ||  || — || November 13, 2010 || Mount Lemmon || Mount Lemmon Survey ||  || align=right data-sort-value="0.77" | 770 m || 
|-id=946 bgcolor=#d6d6d6
| 552946 ||  || — || November 14, 2010 || Mount Lemmon || Mount Lemmon Survey ||  || align=right | 2.3 km || 
|-id=947 bgcolor=#E9E9E9
| 552947 ||  || — || November 12, 2010 || Kitt Peak || Spacewatch ||  || align=right data-sort-value="0.76" | 760 m || 
|-id=948 bgcolor=#E9E9E9
| 552948 ||  || — || January 8, 2007 || Mount Lemmon || Mount Lemmon Survey ||  || align=right | 1.2 km || 
|-id=949 bgcolor=#E9E9E9
| 552949 ||  || — || November 27, 2010 || Mount Lemmon || Mount Lemmon Survey ||  || align=right | 1.4 km || 
|-id=950 bgcolor=#fefefe
| 552950 ||  || — || February 28, 2008 || Mount Lemmon || Mount Lemmon Survey ||  || align=right | 1.1 km || 
|-id=951 bgcolor=#E9E9E9
| 552951 ||  || — || November 11, 2010 || Kitt Peak || Spacewatch ||  || align=right | 1.2 km || 
|-id=952 bgcolor=#FA8072
| 552952 ||  || — || November 2, 2010 || Kitt Peak || Spacewatch ||  || align=right data-sort-value="0.84" | 840 m || 
|-id=953 bgcolor=#E9E9E9
| 552953 ||  || — || September 5, 2010 || Mount Lemmon || Mount Lemmon Survey ||  || align=right | 1.1 km || 
|-id=954 bgcolor=#E9E9E9
| 552954 ||  || — || November 14, 2010 || Kitt Peak || Spacewatch ||  || align=right | 1.5 km || 
|-id=955 bgcolor=#E9E9E9
| 552955 ||  || — || October 29, 2010 || Kitt Peak || Spacewatch ||  || align=right | 1.0 km || 
|-id=956 bgcolor=#E9E9E9
| 552956 ||  || — || November 27, 2010 || Mount Lemmon || Mount Lemmon Survey ||  || align=right | 1.1 km || 
|-id=957 bgcolor=#E9E9E9
| 552957 ||  || — || November 6, 2010 || Catalina || CSS ||  || align=right | 1.5 km || 
|-id=958 bgcolor=#E9E9E9
| 552958 ||  || — || November 27, 2010 || Mount Lemmon || Mount Lemmon Survey ||  || align=right | 1.3 km || 
|-id=959 bgcolor=#E9E9E9
| 552959 ||  || — || November 6, 2010 || Kitt Peak || Spacewatch ||  || align=right | 1.1 km || 
|-id=960 bgcolor=#E9E9E9
| 552960 ||  || — || November 27, 2010 || Mount Lemmon || Mount Lemmon Survey ||  || align=right | 1.3 km || 
|-id=961 bgcolor=#fefefe
| 552961 ||  || — || February 9, 2008 || Mount Lemmon || Mount Lemmon Survey ||  || align=right data-sort-value="0.85" | 850 m || 
|-id=962 bgcolor=#E9E9E9
| 552962 ||  || — || December 9, 2001 || Palomar || NEAT ||  || align=right | 2.3 km || 
|-id=963 bgcolor=#fefefe
| 552963 ||  || — || February 27, 2004 || Kitt Peak || M. W. Buie, D. E. Trilling ||  || align=right data-sort-value="0.61" | 610 m || 
|-id=964 bgcolor=#d6d6d6
| 552964 ||  || — || February 25, 2007 || Mount Lemmon || Mount Lemmon Survey ||  || align=right | 2.9 km || 
|-id=965 bgcolor=#E9E9E9
| 552965 ||  || — || April 14, 2008 || Mount Lemmon || Mount Lemmon Survey ||  || align=right | 1.4 km || 
|-id=966 bgcolor=#E9E9E9
| 552966 ||  || — || May 3, 2008 || Mount Lemmon || Mount Lemmon Survey ||  || align=right | 1.3 km || 
|-id=967 bgcolor=#E9E9E9
| 552967 ||  || — || November 27, 2010 || Mount Lemmon || Mount Lemmon Survey ||  || align=right | 1.8 km || 
|-id=968 bgcolor=#E9E9E9
| 552968 ||  || — || November 27, 2010 || Mount Lemmon || Mount Lemmon Survey ||  || align=right | 1.5 km || 
|-id=969 bgcolor=#E9E9E9
| 552969 ||  || — || November 28, 2010 || Mount Lemmon || Mount Lemmon Survey ||  || align=right | 1.1 km || 
|-id=970 bgcolor=#E9E9E9
| 552970 ||  || — || November 30, 2010 || Mount Lemmon || Mount Lemmon Survey ||  || align=right | 1.1 km || 
|-id=971 bgcolor=#E9E9E9
| 552971 ||  || — || October 15, 2001 || Palomar || NEAT ||  || align=right | 1.8 km || 
|-id=972 bgcolor=#E9E9E9
| 552972 ||  || — || November 7, 2010 || Mount Lemmon || Mount Lemmon Survey ||  || align=right | 1.7 km || 
|-id=973 bgcolor=#E9E9E9
| 552973 ||  || — || September 21, 2001 || Anderson Mesa || LONEOS ||  || align=right | 1.8 km || 
|-id=974 bgcolor=#E9E9E9
| 552974 ||  || — || October 29, 2010 || Mount Lemmon || Mount Lemmon Survey ||  || align=right | 1.5 km || 
|-id=975 bgcolor=#E9E9E9
| 552975 ||  || — || October 14, 2010 || Mount Lemmon || Mount Lemmon Survey ||  || align=right | 1.1 km || 
|-id=976 bgcolor=#E9E9E9
| 552976 ||  || — || April 16, 2012 || Bergisch Gladbach || W. Bickel ||  || align=right | 1.5 km || 
|-id=977 bgcolor=#E9E9E9
| 552977 ||  || — || November 19, 2006 || Kitt Peak || Spacewatch || MAR || align=right | 1.3 km || 
|-id=978 bgcolor=#E9E9E9
| 552978 ||  || — || November 13, 2010 || Mount Lemmon || Mount Lemmon Survey ||  || align=right | 1.4 km || 
|-id=979 bgcolor=#E9E9E9
| 552979 ||  || — || April 12, 2004 || Kitt Peak || Spacewatch ||  || align=right | 1.4 km || 
|-id=980 bgcolor=#E9E9E9
| 552980 ||  || — || August 5, 2005 || Palomar || NEAT ||  || align=right | 1.4 km || 
|-id=981 bgcolor=#E9E9E9
| 552981 ||  || — || December 2, 2010 || Kitt Peak || Mount Lemmon Survey ||  || align=right data-sort-value="0.96" | 960 m || 
|-id=982 bgcolor=#E9E9E9
| 552982 ||  || — || November 12, 2010 || Charleston || R. Holmes ||  || align=right | 1.6 km || 
|-id=983 bgcolor=#E9E9E9
| 552983 ||  || — || December 3, 2010 || Mount Lemmon || Mount Lemmon Survey ||  || align=right data-sort-value="0.75" | 750 m || 
|-id=984 bgcolor=#E9E9E9
| 552984 ||  || — || July 13, 2001 || Palomar || NEAT ||  || align=right | 2.7 km || 
|-id=985 bgcolor=#E9E9E9
| 552985 ||  || — || December 5, 2010 || Mount Lemmon || Mount Lemmon Survey ||  || align=right data-sort-value="0.84" | 840 m || 
|-id=986 bgcolor=#E9E9E9
| 552986 ||  || — || December 26, 2006 || Kitt Peak || Spacewatch ||  || align=right | 1.8 km || 
|-id=987 bgcolor=#E9E9E9
| 552987 ||  || — || December 1, 2010 || Mount Lemmon || Mount Lemmon Survey ||  || align=right | 2.8 km || 
|-id=988 bgcolor=#E9E9E9
| 552988 ||  || — || November 11, 2010 || Mount Lemmon || Mount Lemmon Survey ||  || align=right | 1.2 km || 
|-id=989 bgcolor=#E9E9E9
| 552989 ||  || — || September 21, 2001 || Kitt Peak || Spacewatch ||  || align=right | 1.4 km || 
|-id=990 bgcolor=#E9E9E9
| 552990 ||  || — || November 23, 2006 || Mount Lemmon || Mount Lemmon Survey ||  || align=right | 1.7 km || 
|-id=991 bgcolor=#E9E9E9
| 552991 ||  || — || January 9, 2002 || Socorro || LINEAR ||  || align=right | 1.7 km || 
|-id=992 bgcolor=#E9E9E9
| 552992 ||  || — || October 14, 2005 || Kitt Peak || Spacewatch ||  || align=right | 1.7 km || 
|-id=993 bgcolor=#E9E9E9
| 552993 ||  || — || December 6, 2010 || Catalina || CSS ||  || align=right | 1.4 km || 
|-id=994 bgcolor=#E9E9E9
| 552994 ||  || — || November 17, 2006 || Mount Lemmon || Mount Lemmon Survey ||  || align=right | 1.2 km || 
|-id=995 bgcolor=#E9E9E9
| 552995 ||  || — || December 4, 2010 || Kislovodsk Mtn. || E. S. Romas ||  || align=right | 1.1 km || 
|-id=996 bgcolor=#E9E9E9
| 552996 ||  || — || December 5, 2010 || Kitt Peak || Spacewatch ||  || align=right | 1.5 km || 
|-id=997 bgcolor=#E9E9E9
| 552997 ||  || — || December 6, 2010 || Mount Lemmon || Mount Lemmon Survey ||  || align=right | 1.8 km || 
|-id=998 bgcolor=#E9E9E9
| 552998 ||  || — || November 14, 2010 || La Sagra || OAM Obs. ||  || align=right | 2.1 km || 
|-id=999 bgcolor=#E9E9E9
| 552999 ||  || — || May 8, 2008 || Kitt Peak || Spacewatch ||  || align=right | 1.5 km || 
|-id=000 bgcolor=#E9E9E9
| 553000 ||  || — || December 6, 2010 || Mount Lemmon || Mount Lemmon Survey ||  || align=right | 1.5 km || 
|}

References

External links 
 Discovery Circumstances: Numbered Minor Planets (550001)–(555000) (IAU Minor Planet Center)

0552